= Šalata =

Neighbourhood of Zagreb, Croatia

Coordinates: 45°49.4′N 15°59.1′E

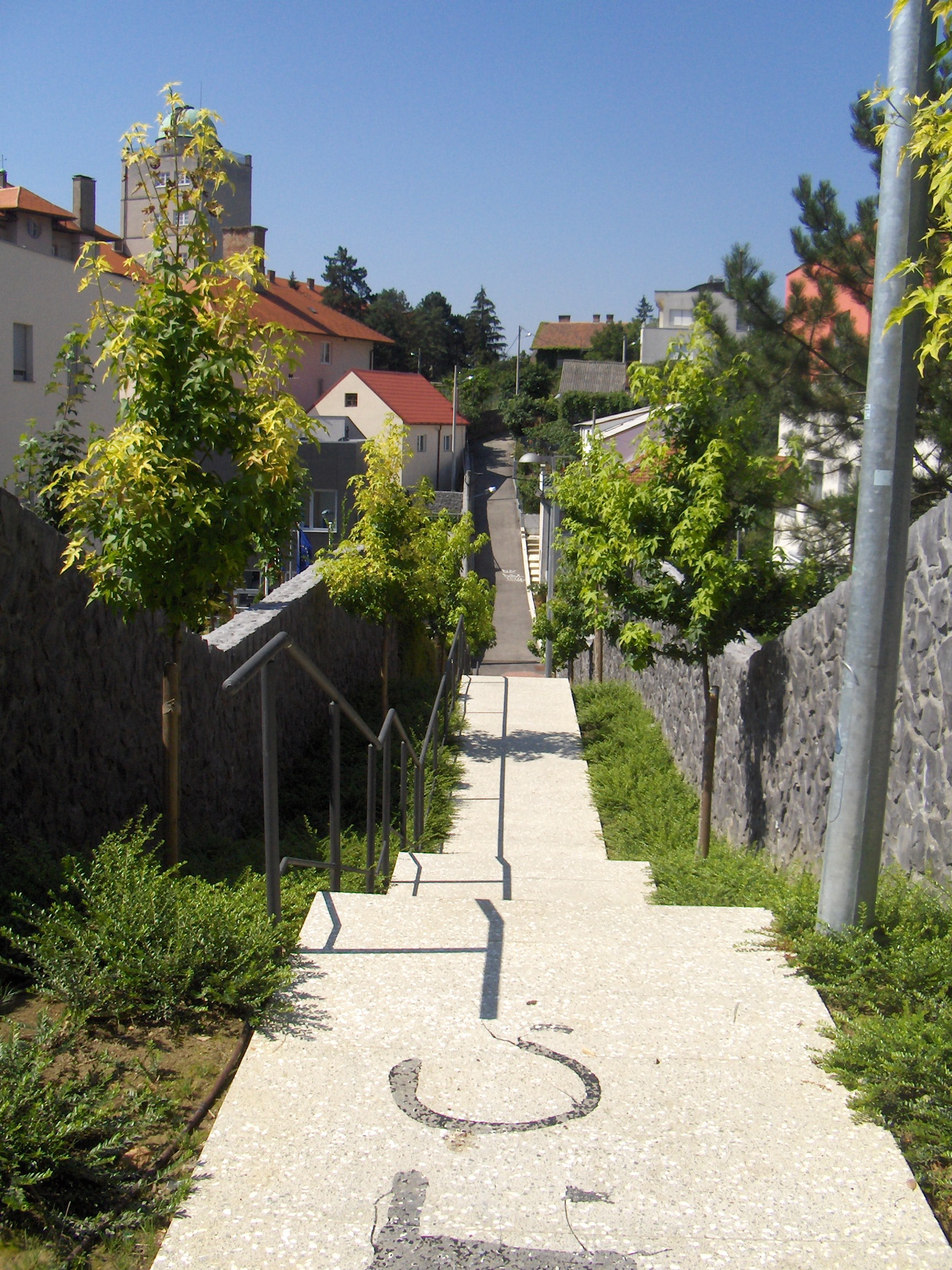
Southeastern Šalata

Šalata (pronounced [ʃaˈlata]) is a residential neighborhood in Zagreb, Croatia. It is administratively part of the Gornji Grad - Medveščak city district in the northern part of Zagreb and it has a population of 1,929.

Šalata houses the Šalata Sport and Recreation Center (ŠRC Šalata) and the University Hospital Centre Zagreb (KBC Zagreb). The neighborhood is located east of Medveščak Road, the main thoroughfare of its parent city district, on the gentle slopes of the Medvednica. Due to its hilly nature, Šalata is approximately 40 to 70 meters (130 to 230 ft) above downtown Zagreb.

The residents of Šalata are close to almost all major events outside the neighborhoods due to their proximity to both the old city cores of Gornji Grad and Kaptol, and the current center, Donji Grad. Šalata is praised for great views of the city because of its higher altitude in relation to the rest of the city and its position on some of the southernmost hills of Medvednica. Due to these factors, real estate in Šalata is relatively expensive compared with other districts, which made it become home to many influential people from the political, musical and sports scene in Croatia.

== Geography ==
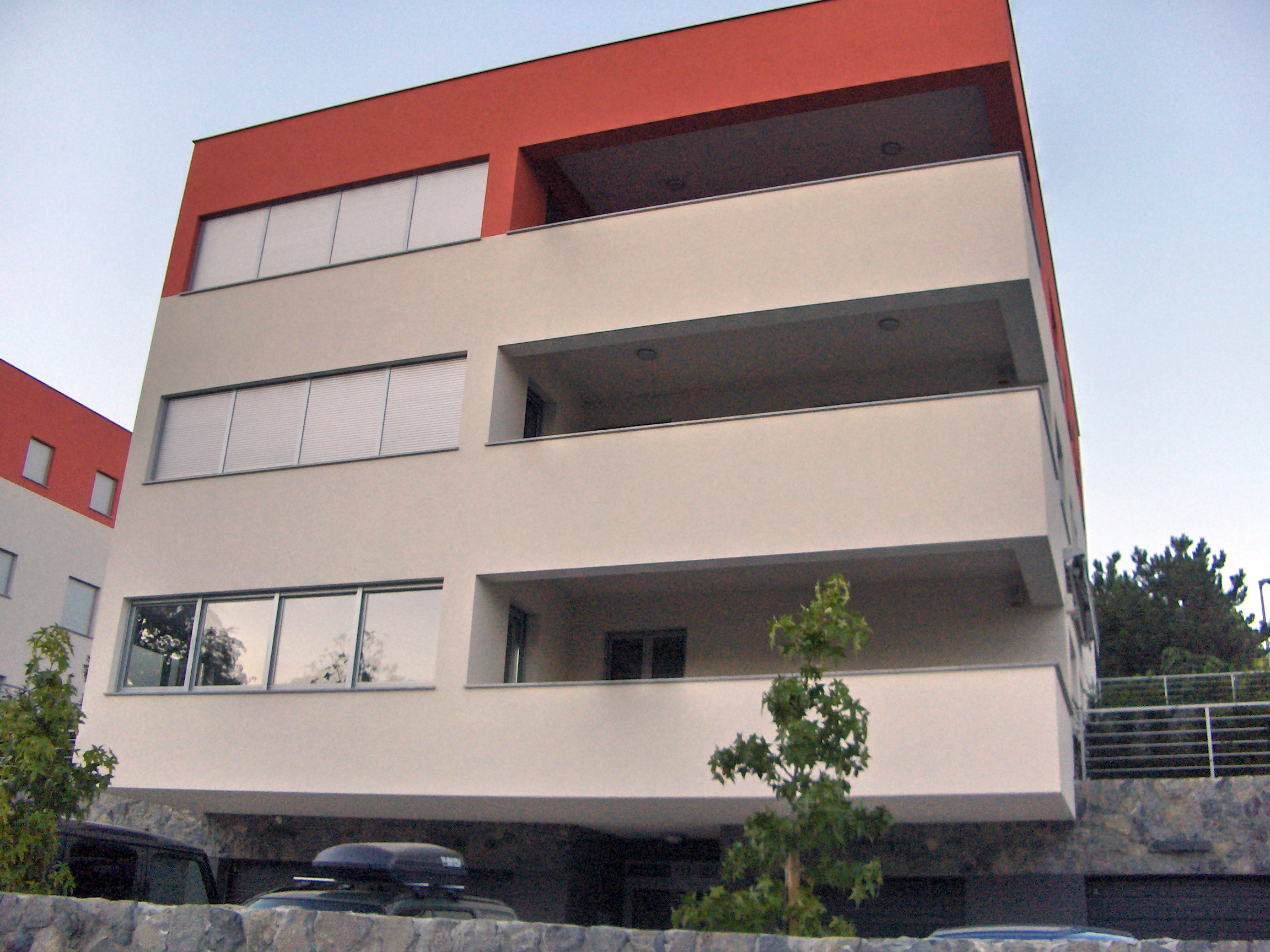
New development on Babonićeva Street

Šalata was quickly urbanized in the early and mid-20th century following a rapid expansion of Zagreb. The urbanization can be explained by its prime location on the slopes of the Medvednica Mountain and its proximity to the Ban Jelačić Square. Nonetheless, the neighborhood retains an environmentally friendly image, housing the botanical garden "Fran Kušan" in Zagreb, owned by the faculty of Pharmacy and Biochemistry of the University of Zagreb. The garden is located at the end of the quiet Schrottova Street. Although only 24,000 m^{2} (5.9 acres) in area, the garden contains over 2,000 plant species.

Šalata's mass transit consists of four bus lines: numbers 106, 201, 226 and 238. All the lines run along Grškovićeva Street and Bijenička Road up to the Ruđer Bošković Institute. At this point 106 and 226 continue northwest towards the Mirogoj and the rest continue northeast along the Bijenička Road. The southeastern part remains away from bus routes, so the City of Zagreb administration deems Šalata badly connected to the rest of the city, and plans to add more bus lines. The neighborhood does not have any tram lines, so its inhabitants have to either descend by staircases to nearby arterial roads like Ribnjak and Vlaška Street, or take the bus to Kaptol near Ban Jelačić Square to reach the nearest tram stations. On 31 January 2009, the minibus line 204 was assigned to Šalata. It runs on a circular route between Kvaternik Square and the eastern parts of the neighborhood.

Babonićeva Street, connected to the rest of Šalata only by staircases, has recently experienced a rise in construction of luxury apartment buildings three or four stories high, and is the first in Croatia to feature digital homes. The new development has been criticized, though, because the houses are located in a canyon, which allows their roofs to be seen from nearby streets. Babonićeva Street used to be a cul-de-sac, but was enlarged upon the construction of apartment buildings at the expense of some orchards owned by the Roman Catholic Archdiocese of Zagreb, which had a church nearby. The enlargement was envisioned already in 1988 by the architect Branko Kincl, but the street extension started only in the mid-2000s.

== History ==
Šalata was built along several arterial roads: Bijenička Road, Voćarska Road and Grškovićeva Street. The first development occurred around Šalata Street, near today's School of Medicine in the southwest part of the neighborhood. As the city grew, the neighborhood expanded northward. This created garbled street patterns in the south, but led to straight north-south streets and random east-west connectors north of Grškovićeva Street. East of Voćarska and Bijenička Street the neighborhood is located on steep slopes and canyons, generating long, steep north-south streets connected by staircases. The most expensive houses are primarily located along the major thoroughfares, which tend not to exhibit much traffic due to the Šalata's proximity of Medveščak Road, the main route to the northernmost parts of Zagreb. In the southern part of the neighborhood is the Voćarsko naselje, a small, but densely built neighborhood that has become a sort of a microdistrict on its own. It is not as expensive due to little road access and parking problems. It was built in 1962 and the residents moved in during 1964. It also contains a kindergarten.

Šalata used to be a village where farmers used to hold cattle and produce dairy products for the farmers' market in the city. At the beginning of the 20th century, the city spread north and the area was rapidly urbanized and became known as Šalata around the 1920s. Between 1945 and 1952, Šalata was a part of the 2nd raion. After 1945 the 2nd raion became the Medveščak municipality and Šalata formally became a neighborhood. Up until 1990 the definition of a neighborhood was coded by city ordinances, at which point Croatia separated from the rest of the then existing Yugoslavia and neighborhood definitions were scrapped. Šalata again became an informal division of the Gornji Grad – Medveščak city district. Today, the neighborhood consists mostly of single-family homes or mansions and small three- or four-story luxury apartment buildings with apartments usually stretching one or two stories. Real estate prices are currently increasing due to the neighborhood being close to most city amenities.

== Education and research ==
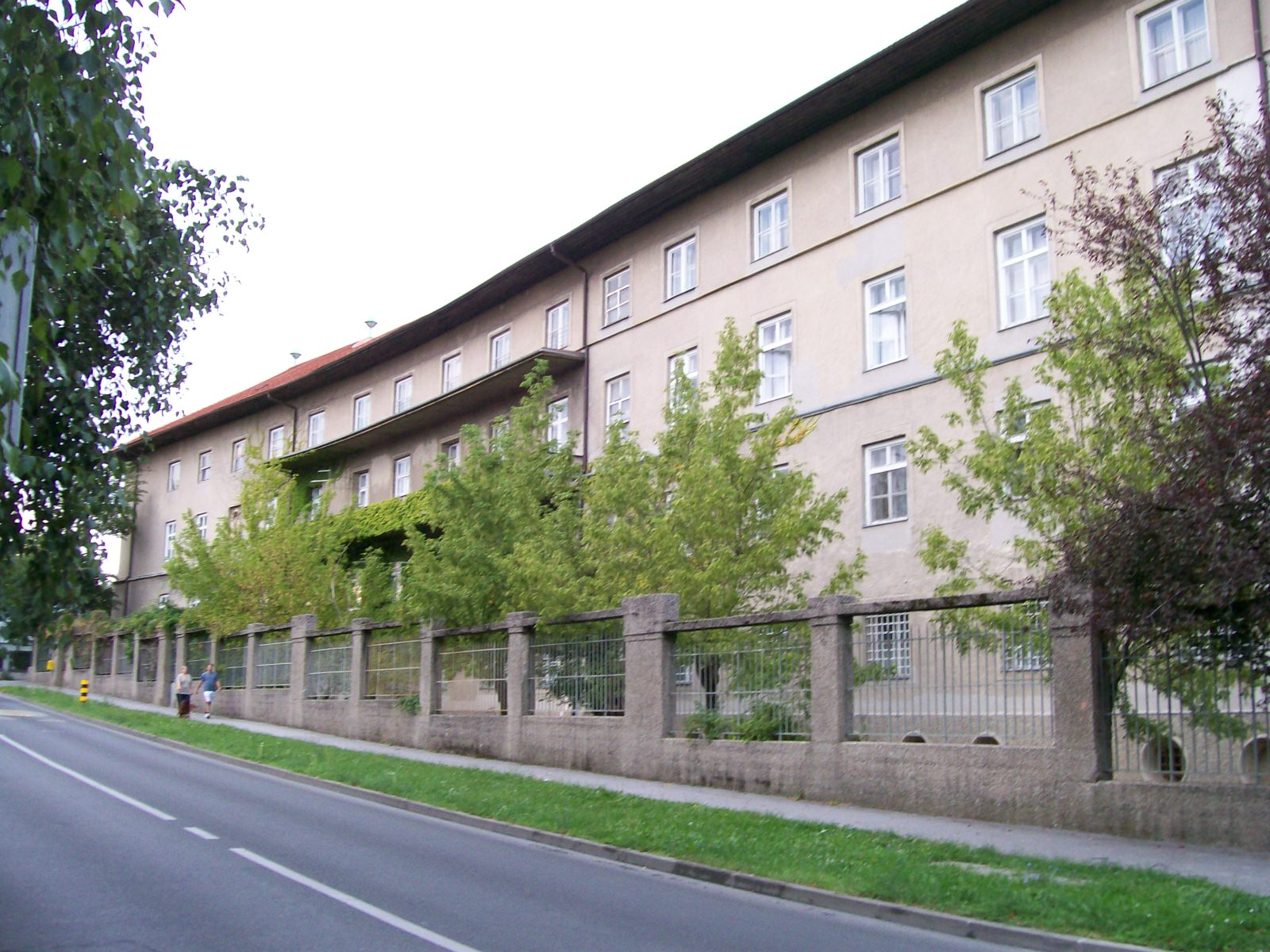
Archbishop Classic Gymnasium on Voćarska Road

Most of Šalata and the surrounding neighborhoods are zoned to the Ivan Goran Kovačić elementary school, located near the center of the neighborhood in Mesićeva Street. While there is no high school zoning in Zagreb, the 18th Gymnasium, known for its bilingual classes, shares the building with the elementary school. The Archdiocesan Classical Gymnasium (Croatian: Nadbiskupska klasična gimnazija) is located nearby on Voćarska Road. As for tertiary education, Šalata hosts Faculties of Science (Departments of Mathematics, Physics, Geophysics, Geology and Chemistry) and the Zagreb School of Medicine of the University of Zagreb. Due to this, Šalata is regarded as one of the educational and scientific centers of Zagreb. The Interdiocesan Boys' Seminary (Croatian: Međubiskupsko dječačko sjemenište) is located on Voćarska Road, near the church of Most Sacred Heart of Jesus and the Archdiocesan Classical Gymnasium.

The Ruđer Bošković Institute is located on Bijenička Street in the far north of the neighborhood. Another notable institute in Šalata is the Croatian Institute for Brain Research, which is located on the grounds of the Šalata hospital in Mesićeva Street.

== Culture ==
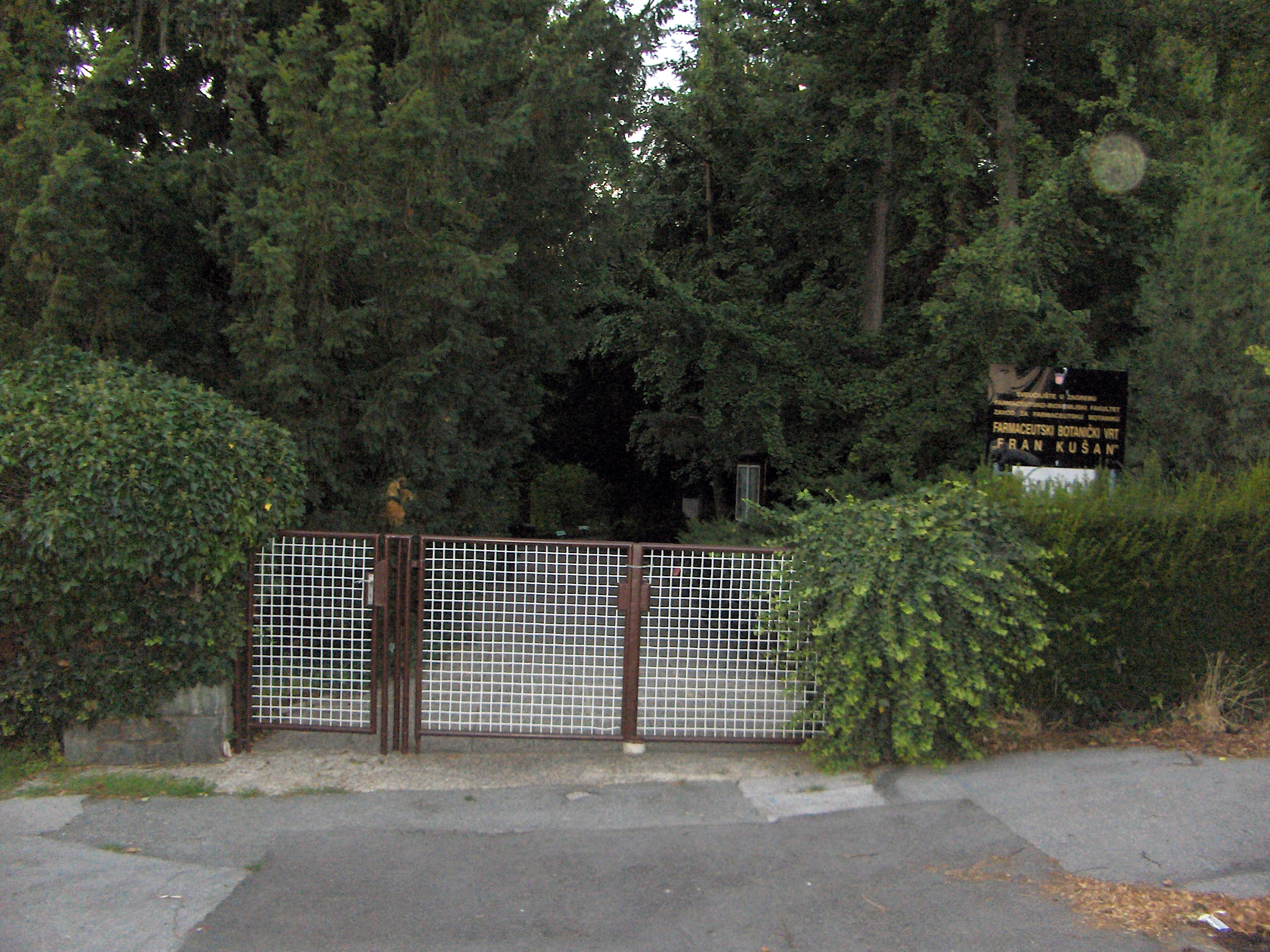
"Fran Kušan" botanical garden in Schrottova Street

The neighborhood is a cultural center of the Gornji Grad – Medveščak city district. It houses two privately owned theaters: Mala scena at the intersection of Grškovićeva Street and Medveščak Road, and Žar ptica on the far northern part of Bijenička Road. In addition to this, Šalata is renowned for being the home of many influential Croatian artists, such as sculptor Vanja Radauš, who owned an atelier on Zmajevac Street and painter Vasilije Jordan.

Šalata is widely known throughout Zagreb for its festivals, including Šalata Open Air Festival, INmusic festival, concerts on the ŠRC Šalata football stadium, and others. These concerts often host world-famous bands and singers, such as Morrissey, Korn, Franz Ferdinand or Faithless. The Papaya nightclub (now called Euphoria Šalata) is located in the neighborhood, near the pool of ŠRC Šalata.

The biggest cemetery in Zagreb, Mirogoj, is located directly north of Šalata, reachable by Bijenička Road and Bollé Street. It is also a heavily visited tourist destination. Mirogoj was built in 1879, shutting down eight other older city cemeteries. It is a major work of its architect, Hermann Bollé. Bollé is responsible for designing the magnificent arcades, which serve the role of Mirogoj western wall, while at the same time being used as graves for honored citizens of Zagreb. For his tributes to the city, Bollé was buried in the Mirogoj arcades and the street leading to Mirogoj from Bijenička Road was named after him. Mirogoj contains sculptures of many prominent Croatian sculptors, such as Dušan Džamonja or Ivan Meštrović. On the Mirogojska Road north of Mirogoj, the Krematorij is located. It is a smaller cemetery devoted to cremations.

== Sports ==
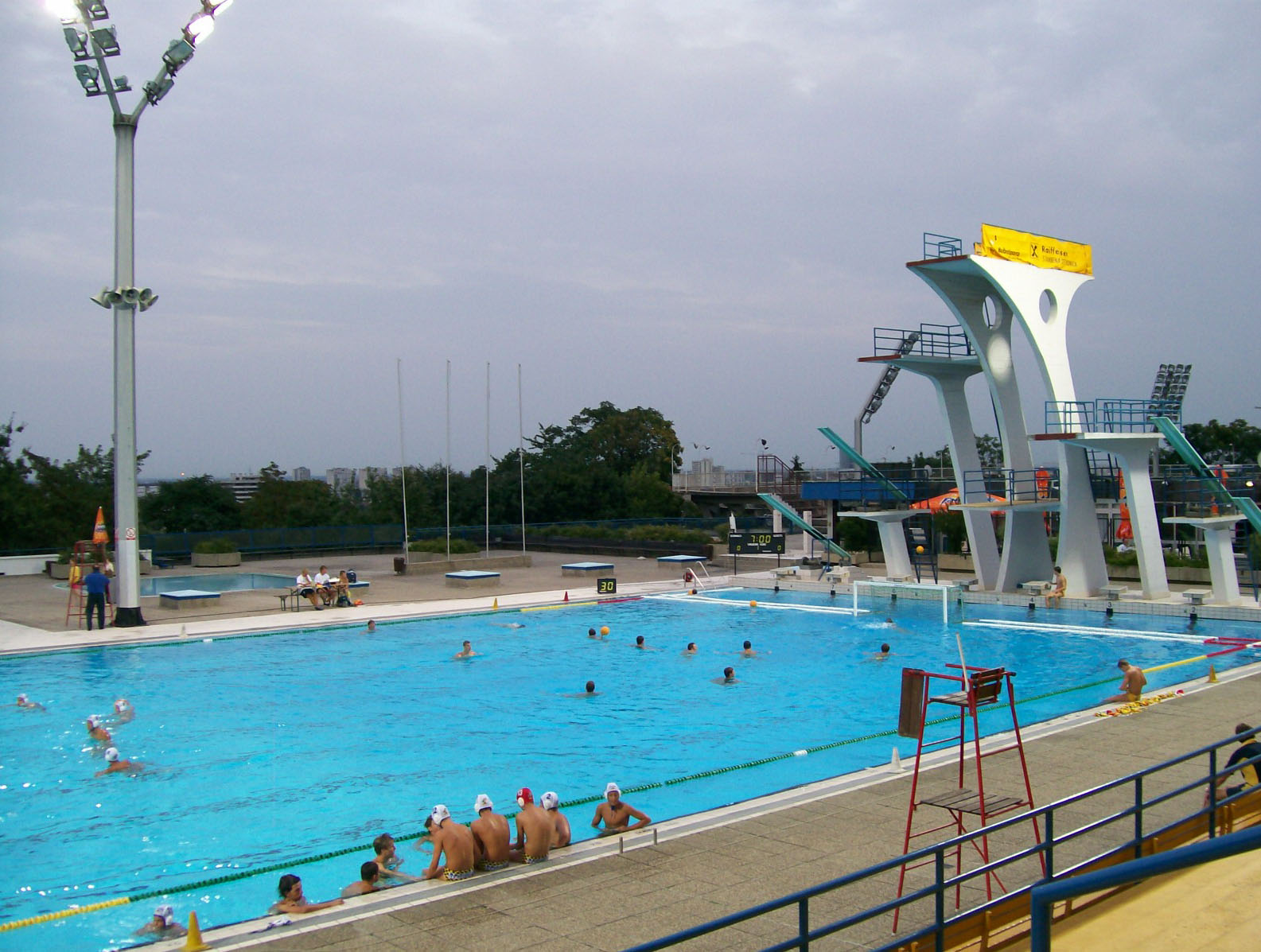
ŠRC Šalata swimming pool

Šalata is known for ŠRC Šalata, the Sports and Recreational Center Šalata. ŠRC Šalata was built in the 1930s instead of expanding the existing Šalata hospital (KBC Šalata). It contains large public swimming pools, tennis courts, basketball courts, and an outdoor soccer stadium that converts to an ice rink in the winter. The center attracts both amateur and professional tennis players with its one regular size and eight smaller tennis courts. Four of these courts are covered during the winter and all are regularly lit during the evening. ŠRC Šalata is the home of Športsko društvo Medveščak, the association of 15 sport clubs based in ŠRC Šalata, most notable being ice hockey, basketball, swimming, handball, water polo and tennis clubs, all named Medveščak. Aside from the pools and courts, the center is equipped with a gym and a fitness club.

== Notable inhabitants ==
Many influential and famous people live or have lived in Šalata. The older part of Šalata, near its center and on Grškovićeva Road, is the wealthier part, consisting of single-family houses. Notable people who live there are Hamed Bangoura, former TV personality and the director of Midikenn fashion model recruitment agency, Savka Dabčević-Kučar, the first woman to be a Prime Minister of Croatia during Josip Broz Tito's reign, Gojko Šušak, the late Croatian Minister of Defense and others. Andrija Hebrang, the president of Croatian Democratic Union parliamentary group and former Health Minister, lives in an apartment in the newly developed Babonićeva Street. Alfi Kabiljo, a composer and musician, lives on Mesićeva Street near the Šalata hospital. Gordan Jandroković, the former Minister of Foreign Affairs and European Integrations, lives in Ružičnjak Street, not far from the residence of Luka Bebić, the former Croatian Parliamentary Speaker. Other notable residents and former residents include Zlatko Vitez, an actor and a former Minister of Culture, Ivo Karlović, a tennis player, also known as Div sa Šalate (Šalata Giant), Boris Novković, a pop singer-songwriter, Vesna Pusić, the head of Croatian People's Party (HNS) and the current Minister of Foreign Affairs and European Integrations and Marin Ivanović "Stoka", a rapper. Ivica Šerfezi, a late pop singer, and Miroslav Miletić, a classical composer, have lived in Voćarsko naselje, a small, but very densely inhabited part of Šalata located near Voćarska Road. Zoran Ferić, a writer and journalist, has lived on Šalata since his childhood. In 2000, two residential villas on Grškovićeva Street were slated to become the residences of President of Croatia and the Speaker of the Croatian Parliament. The proposal was later abandoned in favor of a location in Pantovčak.

=== Embassies ===
Due to its reputation as an upper-class neighborhood, Šalata has been a prime location for embassies for a long time. The embassy of Yugoslavia used to be located in Šalata until Yugoslavia was divided into Serbia and Montenegro in 2006. The neighborhood also contains the Bosnia and Herzegovina embassy, located on Torbarova Street in the southern part of Šalata and the Australian and Malaysian embassies. The Ukrainian embassy is located in the southeastern part on the Voćarska Road. The Slovenian embassy is located at the intersection of Alagovićeva Street and Riesznerova Street. The Bulgarian embassy on the Grškovićeva Street is the newest addition.
