= Tkalčićeva Street =

Street in Zagreb, Croatia

Tkalčić Street
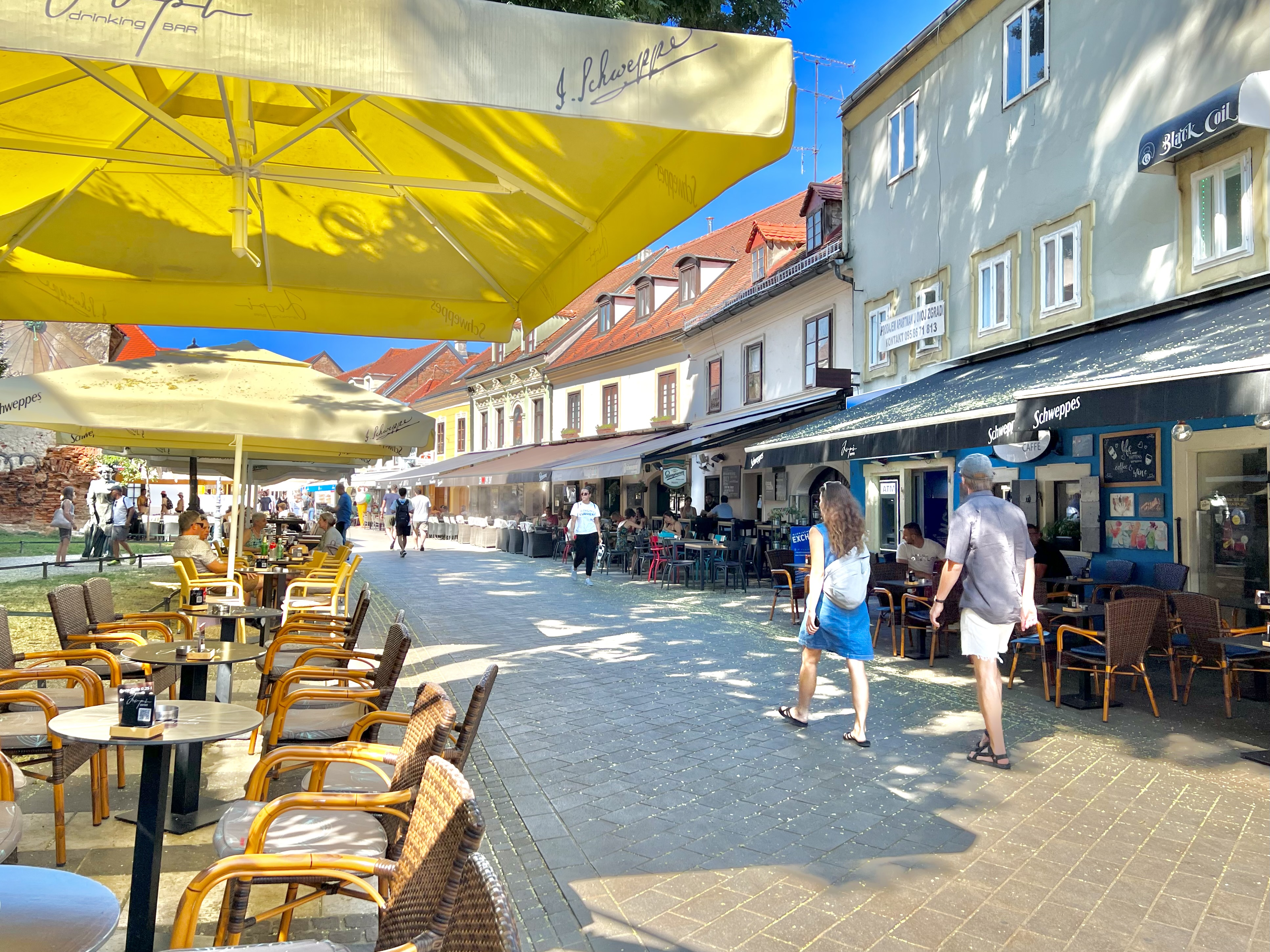
- South view of the street in summer
- Native name: Тkalčićeva ulica (Croatian)
- Length: 0.5 km (0.31 mi)
- Location: Zagreb, Croatia
- Postal code: 10000
- Coordinates: 45°49′02″N 15°58′38″E

Tkalčićeva Street (Croatian: Tkalčićeva ulica, formally: Ivan Tkalčić Street, Ulica Ivana Tkalčića) is a street in the Zagreb, Croatia city center. Extending from the vicinity of the central Ban Jelačić Square to its northern end at the Little Street (Croatian: Mala ulica), the street flows between the Gornji Grad in the west and Nova Ves in the east. The street is administratively within the Gornji Grad–Medveščak city district, constituting the former "August Cesarec" commune (abolished in 1994).

== History ==
Centuries before the today's street emerged, the route of Tkalčićeva Street was covered by the Medveščak creek. Medveščak (at that time also called Crikvenik or Cirkvenik) had been the center of Zagreb industry since the early days of the city, spawning numerous watermills. The watermills caused the development of Zagreb industry, leading in turn to the construction of Zagreb's first cloth, soap, paper and liquor factories and, later, animal skin industry. The watermills were often the subject of feuds between the twin cities, Kaptol and Gradec. A 1392 peace treaty forbade construction of new watermills along the shared city border, between today's southern end of Medvedgradska Street and Ban Jelačić Square, leaving only two mills within the city. Both mills were owned by a Cistercian monastery. However, they were both razed during the 1898 covering of the creek.

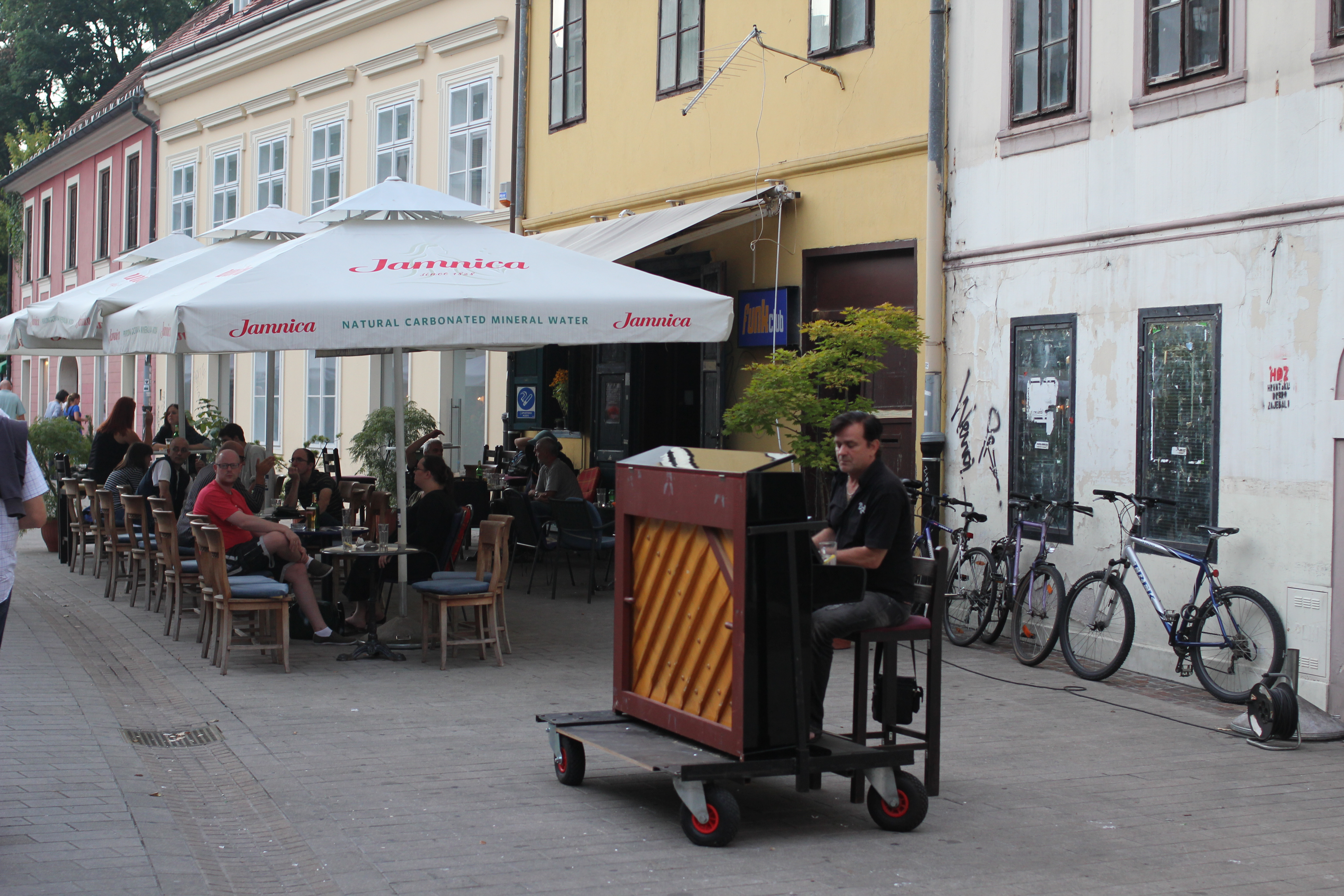
Street pianist in the Tkalčićeva street.

Although both sides of the creek had been inhabited before, the 1898 covering left a full-scale street, which was aptly named Ulica Potok (lit. 'Creek street'). Most of the houses were dated to 18th or 19th century and the street was surfaced with gravel from Sava River excavated in Trnje. Around the middle of the 20th century it was modernized and paved with asphalt. The creek-based industry was quickly transformed into small businesses and stores and the skin industry stopped working in 1938.

According to several records, the transformation of Medveščak creek valley was orchestrated in 1900 by Milan Lenucci, an architect. In 1908, Viktor Kovačić displayed some of his ideas about Ulica Potok in his studies of Gornji Grad, Kaptol and other city neighborhoods. In 1913, Ulica Potok's name is changed to Tkalčićeva Street in honor of the 19th century Zagreb historian Ivan Tkalčić, who was from nearby Nova Ves.

== Red-light district ==
At the turn of the 20th century, prostitution was legal. In Zagreb it was advertised as a tourist attraction and contributed to the city's economy. Tkalčićeva Street was the main centre for brothels. At one stage, every other building was a bordello. To open a brothel, the owner had to register at the town hall and received a licence. The licence required the brothel to be well run and provide a quality service. The women working in the brothels had to have a twice weekly medical examination. Brothels were not allowed to advertise their presence, but a discrete, uncommonly coloured lantern was allowed to be placed outside.

The best known brothel, and most expensive, was the Kod Zelene Lampe (lit. 'By the Green Lantern'). The street's brothels continued to operate until WW2.

== Gallery ==
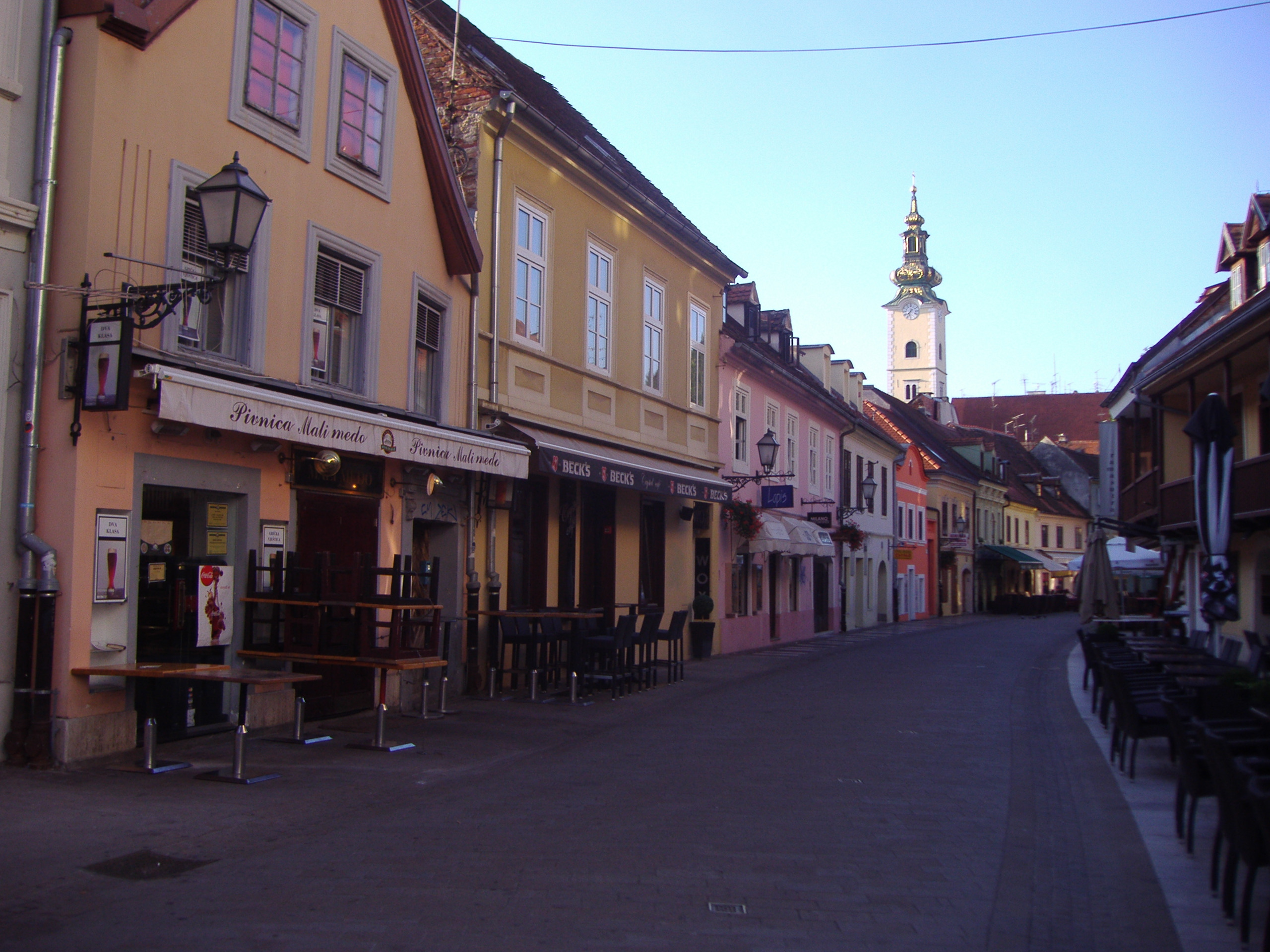
South view of the street

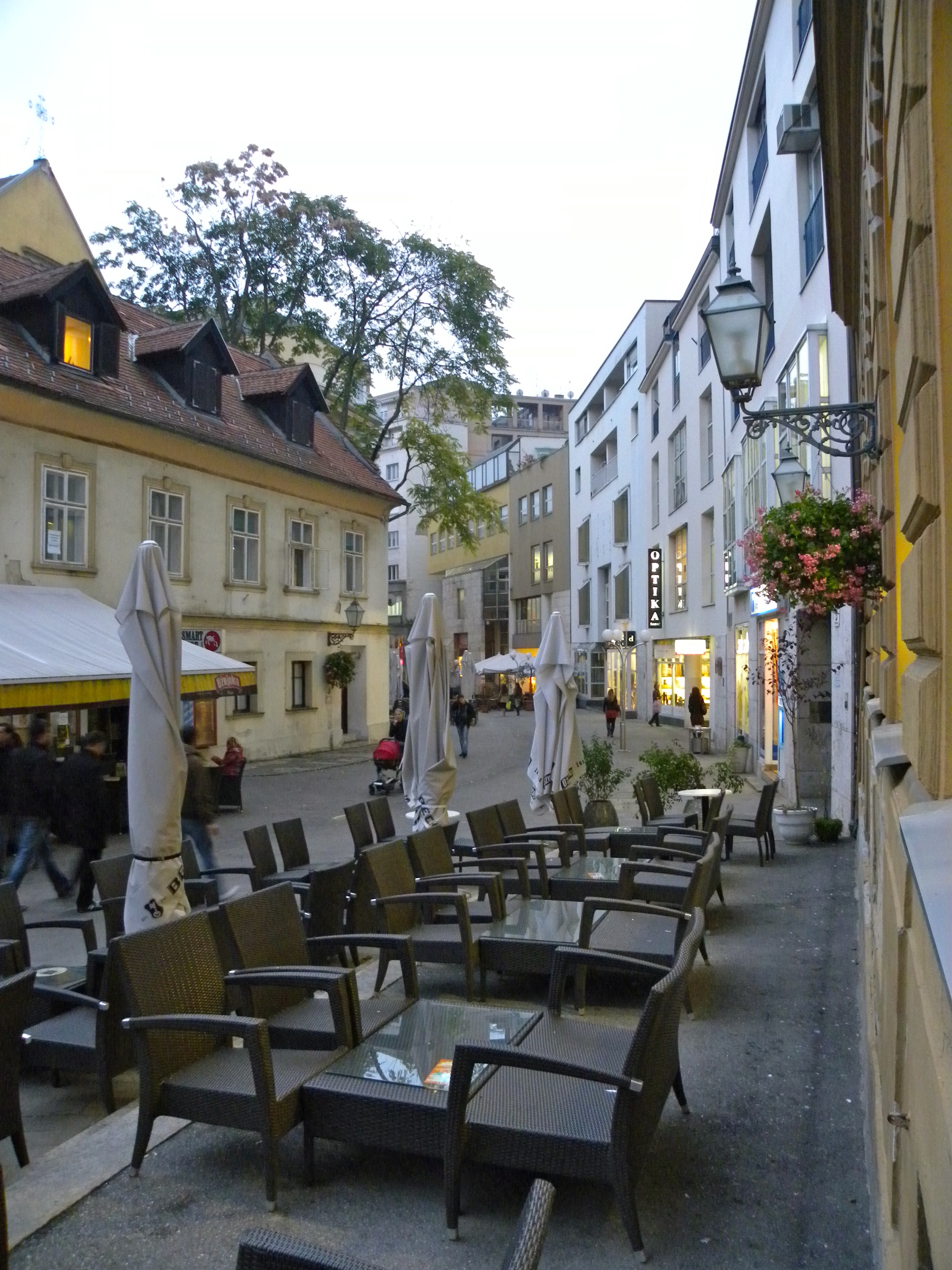
Cafes at beginning of Tkalčićeva street

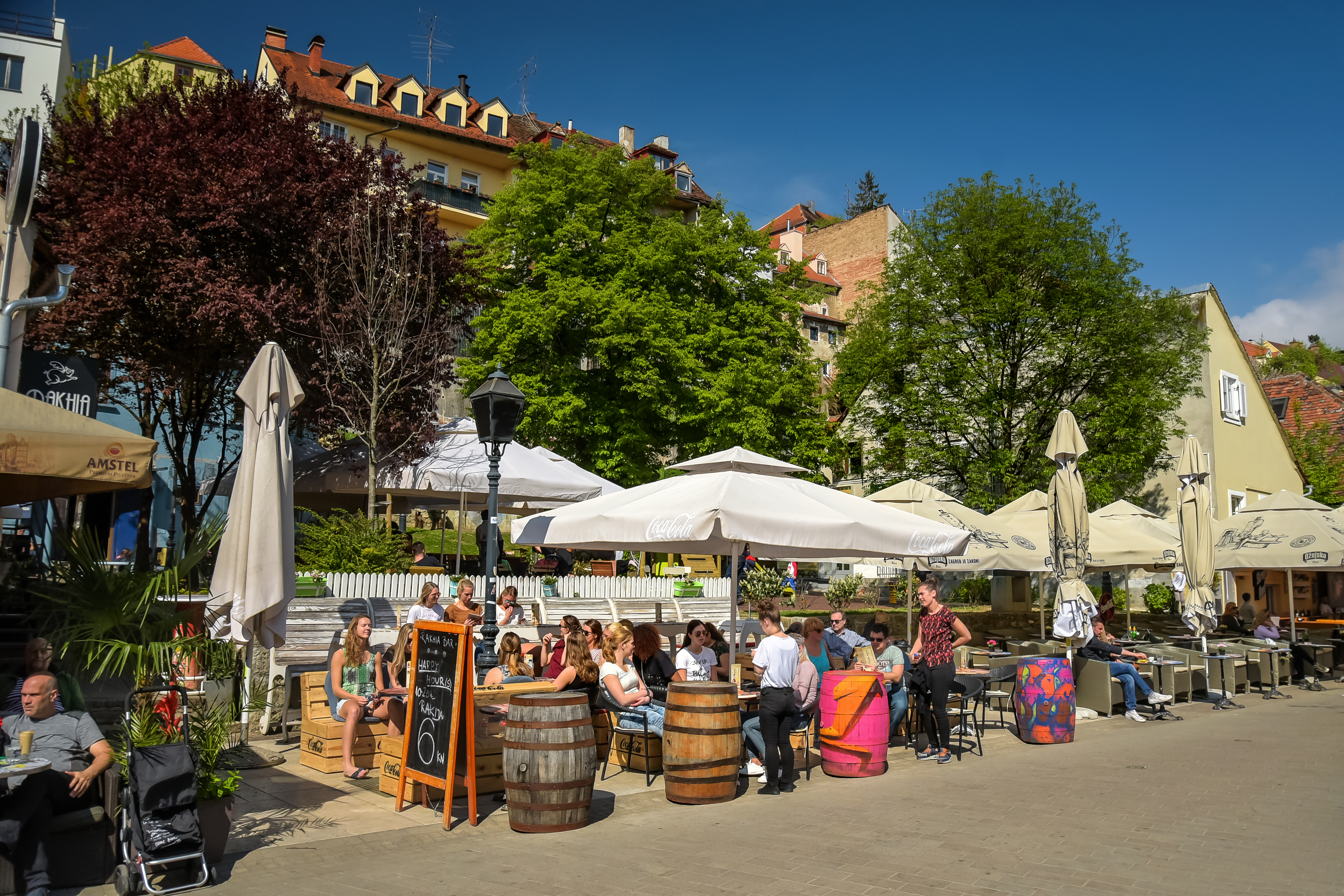
Restaurants

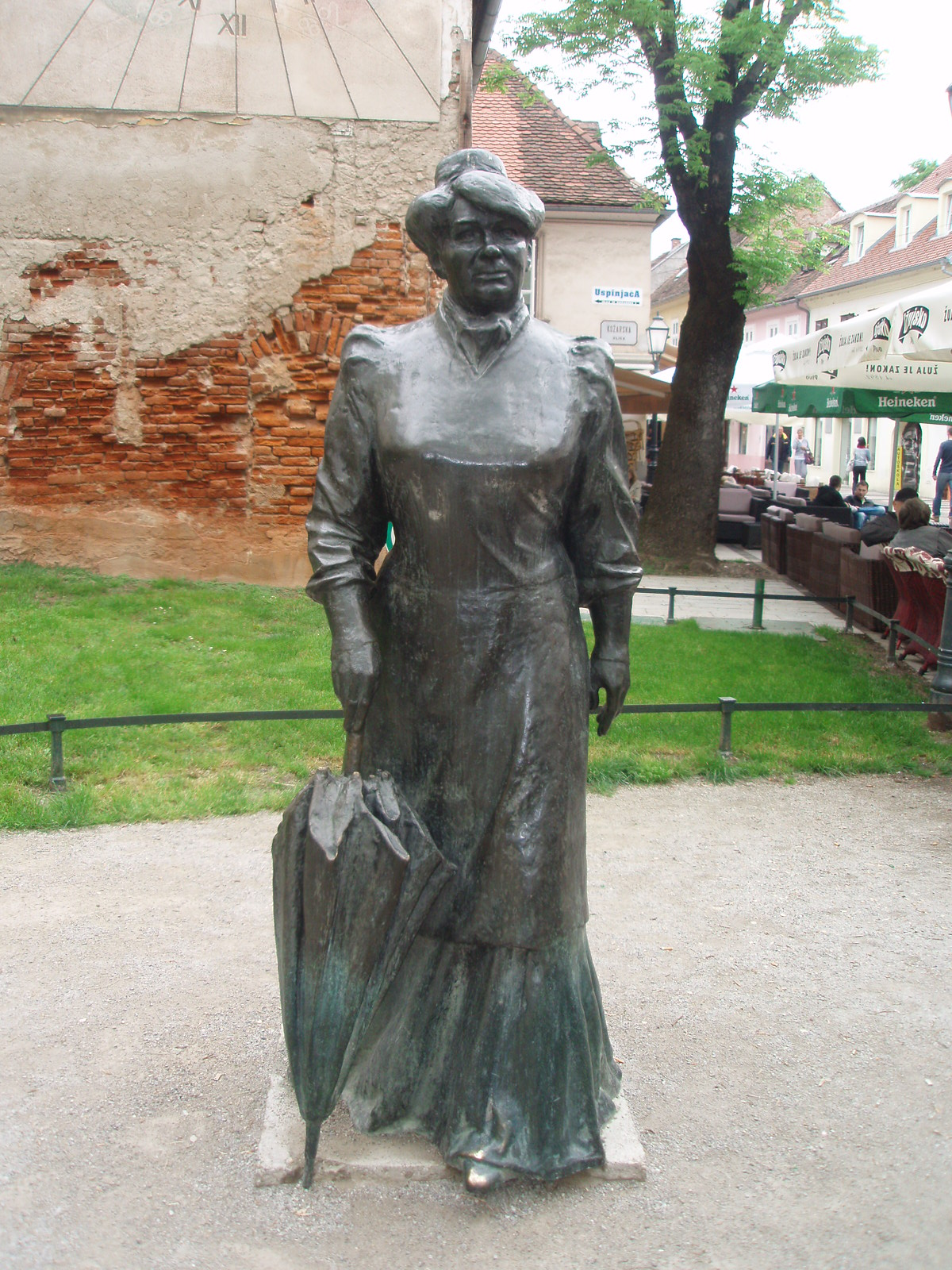
Statue of Croatian writer Marija Jurić Zagorka

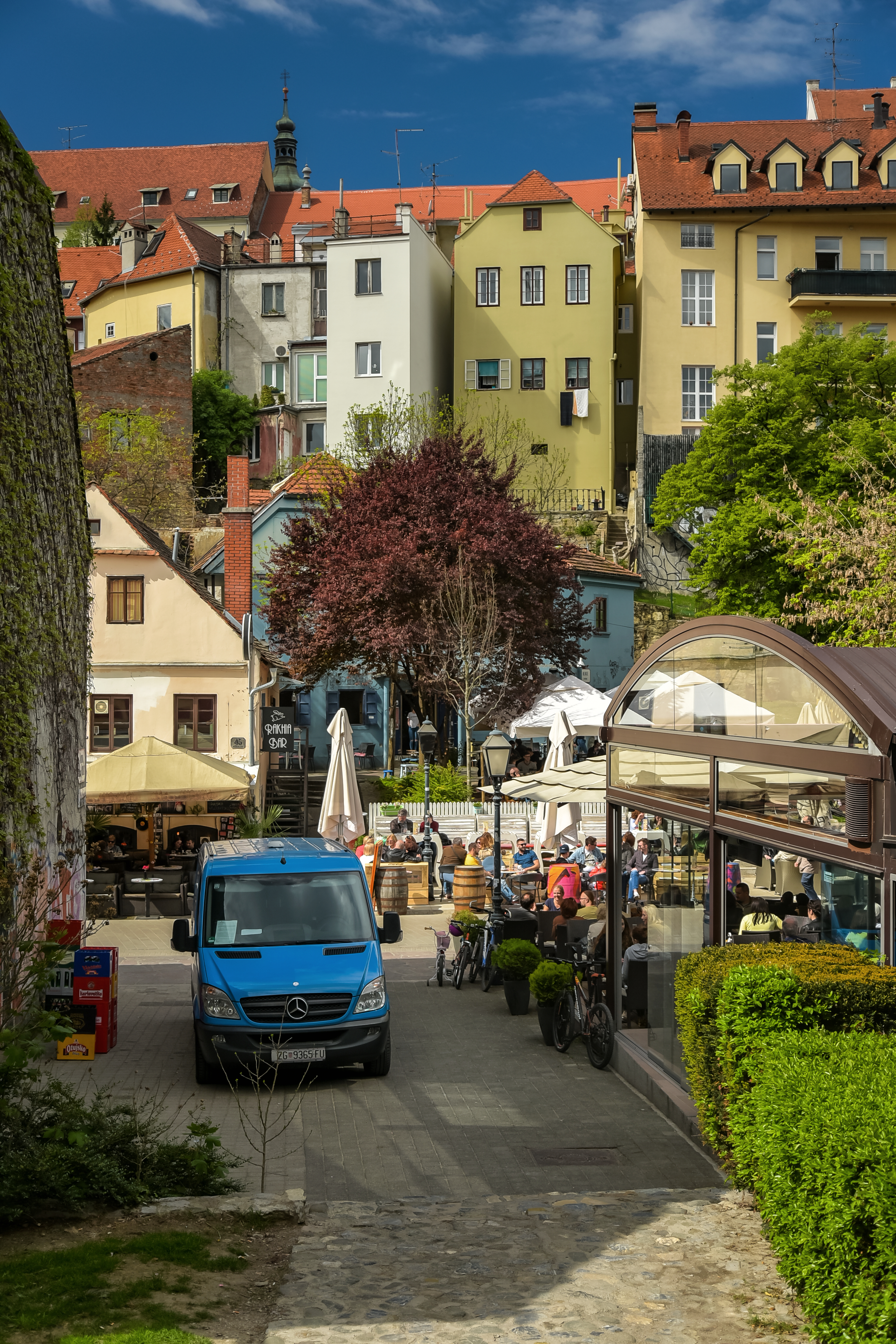
Facades of buildings alongside street

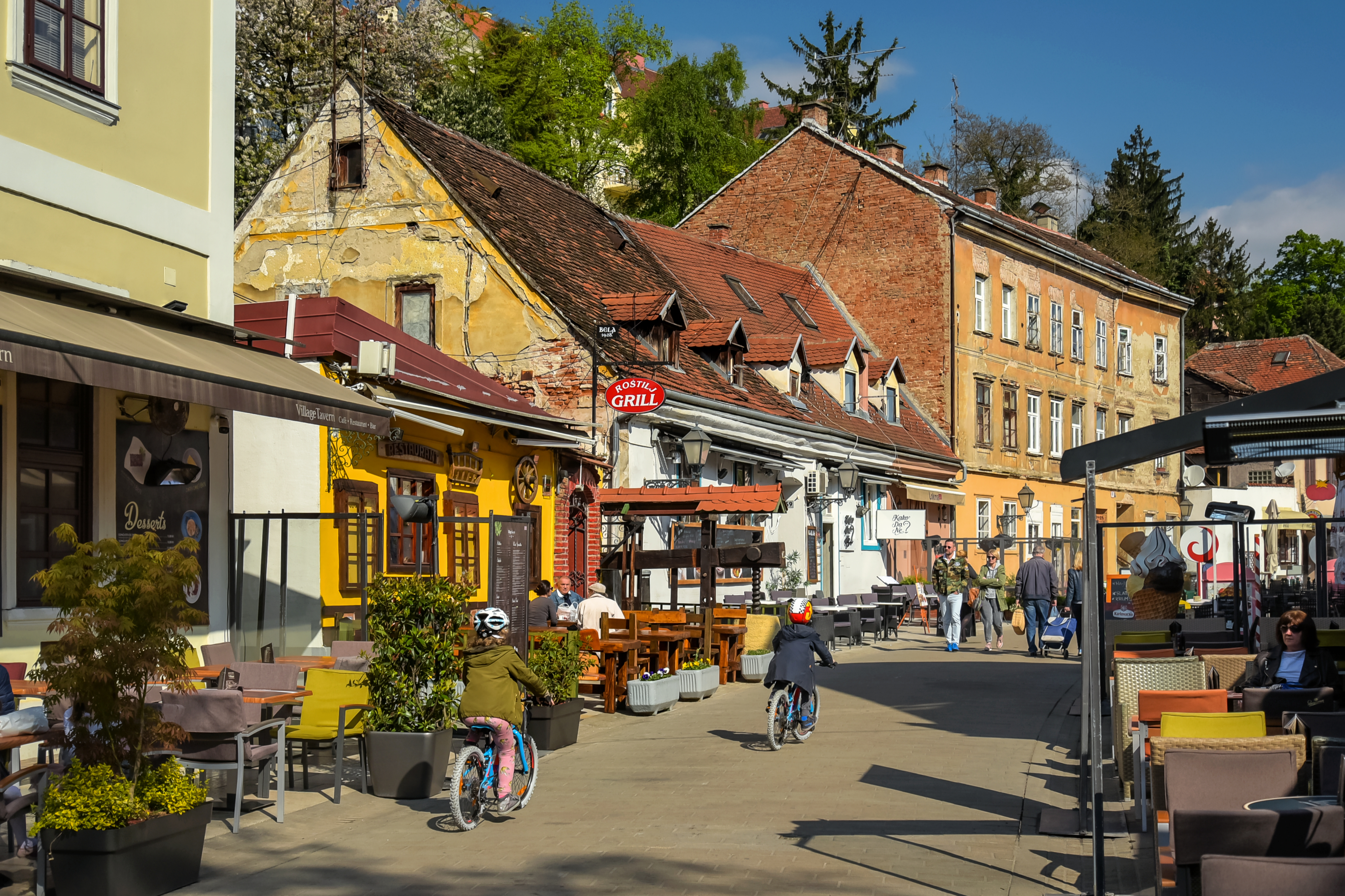
Restaurants & bars
