= Vlaška Street =

Street in Zagreb, Croatia

- Interactive map of Vlaška Street
- Coordinates: 45.8137°N 15.9872°E

The Vlaška Street (Croatian: Vlaška ulica) is a historic street and neighbourhood in the center of Zagreb, Croatia.

== Geography ==
The pedestrian part of the street is lined with older buildings and shops.

It starts at the roundabout at the southern end of Kaptol, the Toma Bakač Street and the Pod zidom Street, going towards the southeast to the European Square where it intersects with the August Cesarec Street (the short Bakač and Cesarec streets connect the Vlaška to the Ban Jelačić Square). From there it continues to the east, passing the Fran Kurelac Street, towards the intersection with the Juraj Branjug Street and the Junije Palmotić Street. From there it continues to the northeast towards the Square of the Victims of May 1995, where it meets the Ribnjak Street and the Janko Drašković Street. This area is part of the "August Cesarec" local administration of the Gornji grad – Medveščak district, and at that point the Vlaška Street is the border between the Ribnjak local administration to the north, and the "Hrvatski narodni vladari" (lit. 'Croatian native rulers') local administration of the Donji grad district to the south.

Continuing towards the east, it intersects with the Drago Ibler Square from the south, and then the Ivan Vončina Street from the north. Then it passes by the local administration "Archbishop Antun Bauer", intersecting with the Juraj Ratkaj Passage and the Antun Bauer Street from the south, until it reaches the Church of St. Peter, a medieval church redesigned by Hermann Bollé, at the intersection with the Petar Petretić Square.

Most of the street has car and tram traffic. The bell tower of St. Peter's Church is visible in the distance.

At that point the Vlaška Street separates the Petrova local administration to the north from the "Matko Laginja" and "Pavao Šubić" local administrations to the south. It continues towards the east, passing by a pedestrian passage towards the Kosta Vojnović Street, the intersection with the Janko Kamauf Street and the Marijan Derenčin Street. Then it turns towards the northeast, passing by a pedestrian passage towards the Jakov Gotovac Street and the intersection with the Josip Galjuf Street. It ends at the Eugen Kvaternik Square, which in turn connects it to the Dragutin Domjanić Street from the north, the easternmost extent of Gornji grad–Medveščak, the Maksimir Street continuing northeast, the Vjekoslav Heinzel Street to the southeast and the Pavao Šubić Street to the southwest.

== History ==
The Vlaška street is located in the area near the Medveščak stream, where numerous Roman coins and artifacts were found in the 19th century, that were investigated by Ivan Tkalčić at the turn of the 20th century, which led to the belief that this is the earliest inhabited area of Zagreb. The earliest mentions of the street called it Vlaška Ves, and a 1198 document by the Duke of Slavonia Andrew II of Hungary mentions a "Latin" population in vicus Latinorum (lit. 'Latin Quarter'), with the Slavic population in villa zagrabiensis (lit. 'Zagreb Settlement'). It is not clear whether this "Latin" or "Vlach" population was from the Roman era or Italians who arrived at the time of the medieval Croatian kingdom, but the concept persisted into the 14th century. In 1478, the Vlaška Street diocesal municipality was formally separated from Nova Ves and Kaptol.

A view of the street in 1938. The bell tower of St. Peter's Church is in the front, while the spires of the Zagreb Cathedral are visible in the distance.

The Church of St. Peter was rebuilt from the ground up between 1769 and 1770, and was consecrated on 5 May 1795 by bishop Maksimilijan Vrhovac. It was later modified in 1839, 1857 and 1885. In the beginning of the 19th century, the street was also known as the Bečka cesta, the Vienna Road. During the times of Bishop Vrhovac, the municipality included the main Vlaška Street as well as parts of Ribnjak, Fran Kurelac Street, Petrova Street, later split into the streets named Klaonička, Draškovićeva, Jurišićeva, Nadbiskupski trg as well as roads called Bijenička, Gospodarska and Voćarska.

In the 1890s, under the leadership of chief urbanist Milan Lenuci, the city relocated the Medveščak, and reconstructed the areas affected by its prior flooding, including the Vlaška. The street was reworked to be a 20 meter wide main connection between the center and the northeast of the town. The expropriation of the buildings required for the entire project took until the 1900s, and was never completed fully, but the previously degraded area was successfully integrated into the city center and Donji grad. The first horsecar line with a one-gauge track was opened in the street in 1891, and the first electric tram with a metre-gauge track in 1910.

In 1962, the street was formally placed under protection by the state, together with Donji grad, as an urban historical monument. This level of protection was in turn extended to the entire old town in 1968 and 1986, and entered into the Register of Cultural Goods of Croatia in 2004.

In 1978, the then City Municipality "Centar" and the Society of Architects of the City of Zagreb conducted an anonymous public tender to revamp the then Republic Square. They selected a group of architects, Mihajlo Kranjc, Branko Silađin and Berislav Šerbetić, who planned an urbanist project for the square and all the incoming streets, including the Vlaška. In the 1980s, as part of the preparations for hosting the 1987 Summer Universiade, much of that area near the square was pedestrianised.

In 1988, a bronze monument to the Croatian novelist August Šenoa, who was born in a house on Vlaška Street 150 years prior, was erected at the intersection with the Branjugova street. The sculpture was created by Marija Ujević Galetović.

In recent times, more of the western parts of the street became pedestrianised, the section near the European Square in 2013, and the section up to the tram lines in Draškovićeva in 2022.

== See also ==
- Šalata
- Lašćina

== Sources ==
- Deželić, Velimir (1923). "Zagrebačka Vlaškoulička općina". Narodna starina (in Croatian). 2 (5). Croatian State Archives. ISSN 1849-1510 – via Hrčak.
- Knežević, Snješka (2010). "Gornji i Donji grad u Zagrebu 21. stoljeća. O problemima revitalizacije zagrebačke povijesne jezgre". Kvartal : Chronicle of Croatian Art History (in Croatian). VII (3–4). Institute of Art History, Zagreb. ISSN 1845-4356.
- Knežević, Snješka (2020). "Lenucijeve avenije: nove prostorne osi Zagreba". Journal of the Institute of History of Art (in Croatian) (44/2). Institute of Art History, Zagreb. ISSN 1845-4534.
- Hedžbeli, Živana (October 2018). "Zagreb Mihajla Kranjca". Exhibition (in Croatian). State Archives in Zagreb.
- Marušić, Ivana (18 June 2024). "Vlaška Street". ZagrebNet blog – Stories from the Museum. Museum of the City of Zagreb.
- "Tram in Zagreb". Zagrebački električni tramvaj. 2012. Archived from the original on 2014-07-24.
