= St. Catherine's Church, Zagreb =

Church of St. Catherine (Croatian: Crkva sv. Katarine)
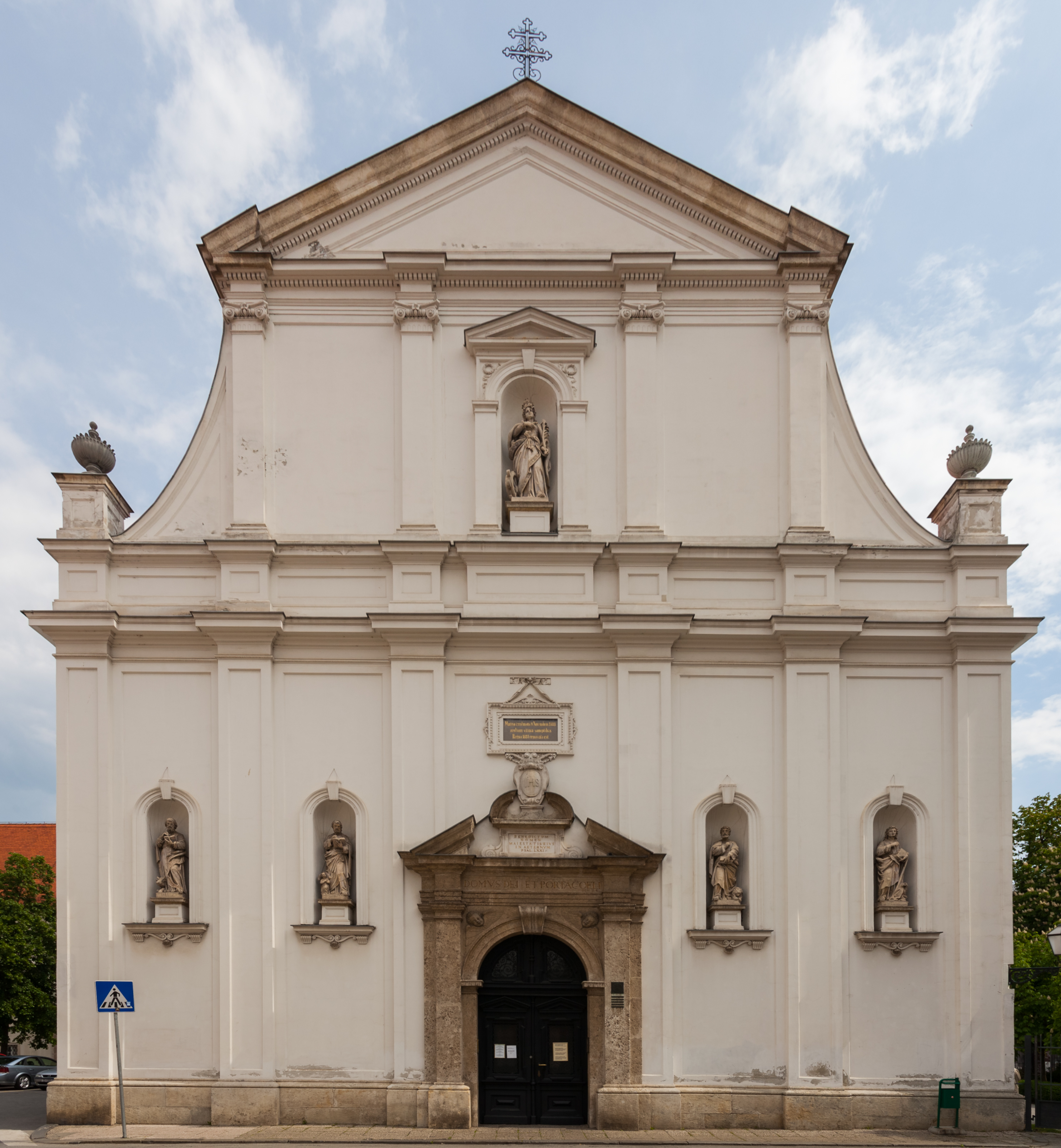
- Church of St. Catherine (Croatian: Crkva sv. Katarine)
- 45°48′53″N 15°58′27″E
- Location: Zagreb
- Country: Croatia
- Denomination: Roman Catholic

History
- Events: Reconstructed in the 19th-20th century

Architecture
- Functional status: Active
- Style: Baroque
- Completed: 1632

Church of St. Catherine (Croatian: Crkva sv. Katarine) is a Baroque-style church in Zagreb. It is located in historic part of Upper town (Gornji Grad), and considered to be the best example of Baroque Architecture in Zagreb.

== History ==
Before the St. Catherine's was built, a 14th-century Dominican church occupied the area. When the Jesuits arrived in Zagreb in the early 17th century, they thought the original church too rundown and inadequate, and worked to build a new church. Construction began in 1620 and was completed in 1632. A monastery was built adjacent to the church, but now the spot is home to the Klovićevi dvori art gallery.

St. Catherine's church was victim to fire twice in history: once in 1645 and again in 1674, devastating the interior. The church was refurnished with help from wealthy Croatian nobles, and in return, they were allowed to display their family coat-of-arms or have the honour to be buried or entombed in the church.

After the disestablishment of the Jesuits, St. Catherine's became part of the parish of St. Mark's in 1793. Since 1874, St. Catherine's has been a Collegiate church.

The church was severely damaged by the 1880 earthquake. After 6 months of repairs, it was reconsecrated in November 1881.

== Overview ==
The church is designed in the Baroque architecture of the 17th century.

== Gallery ==
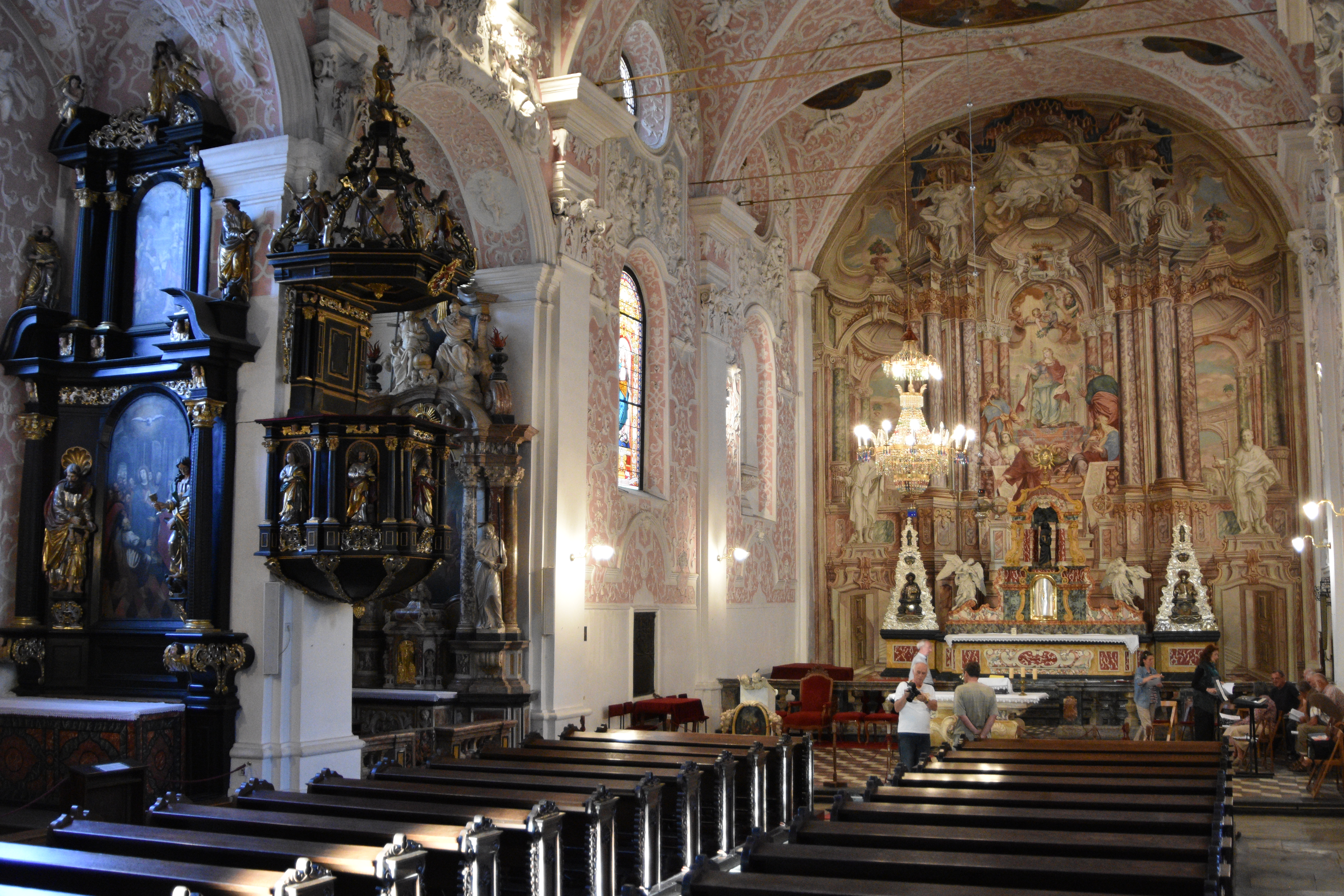
Interior

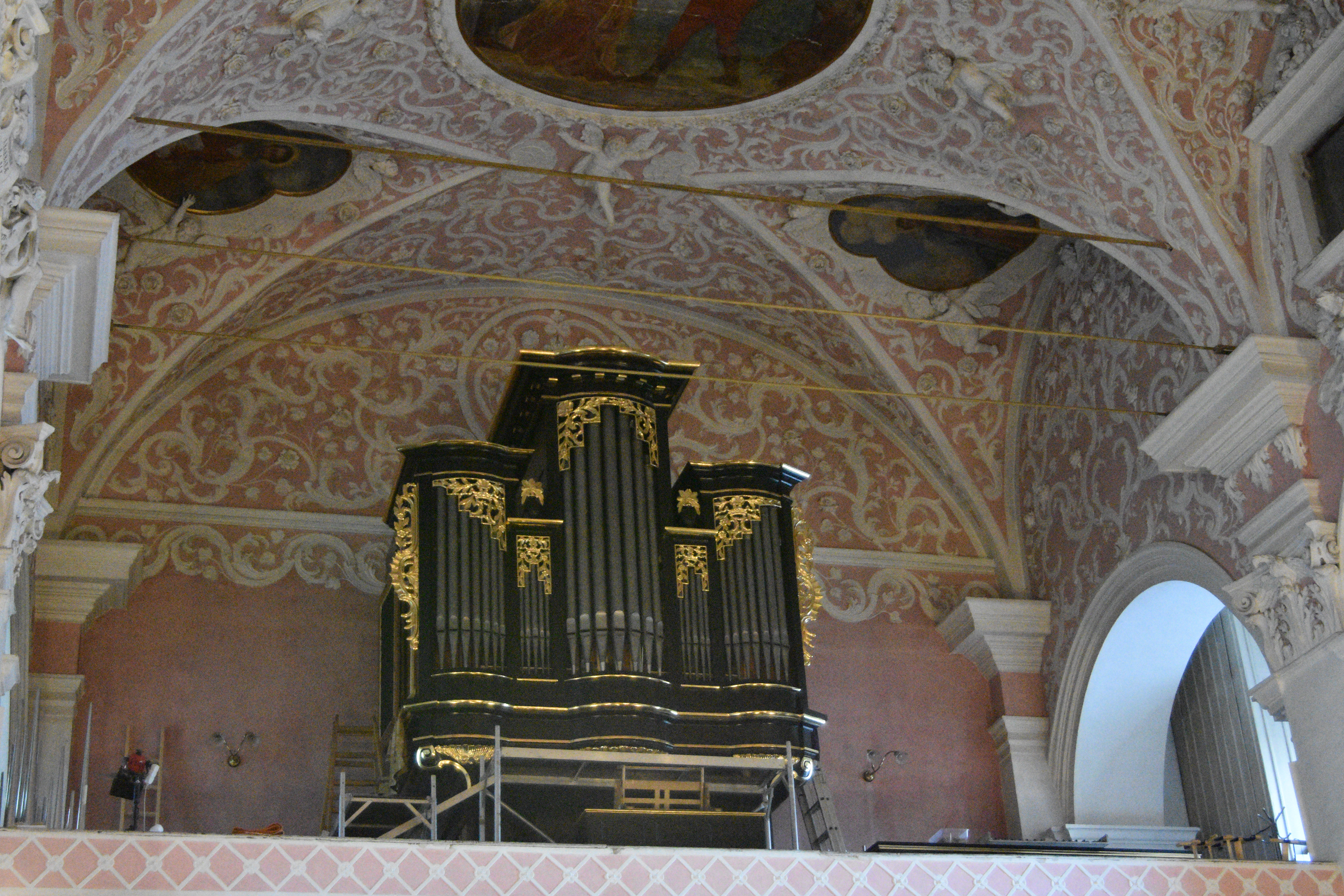
Church pipe organ

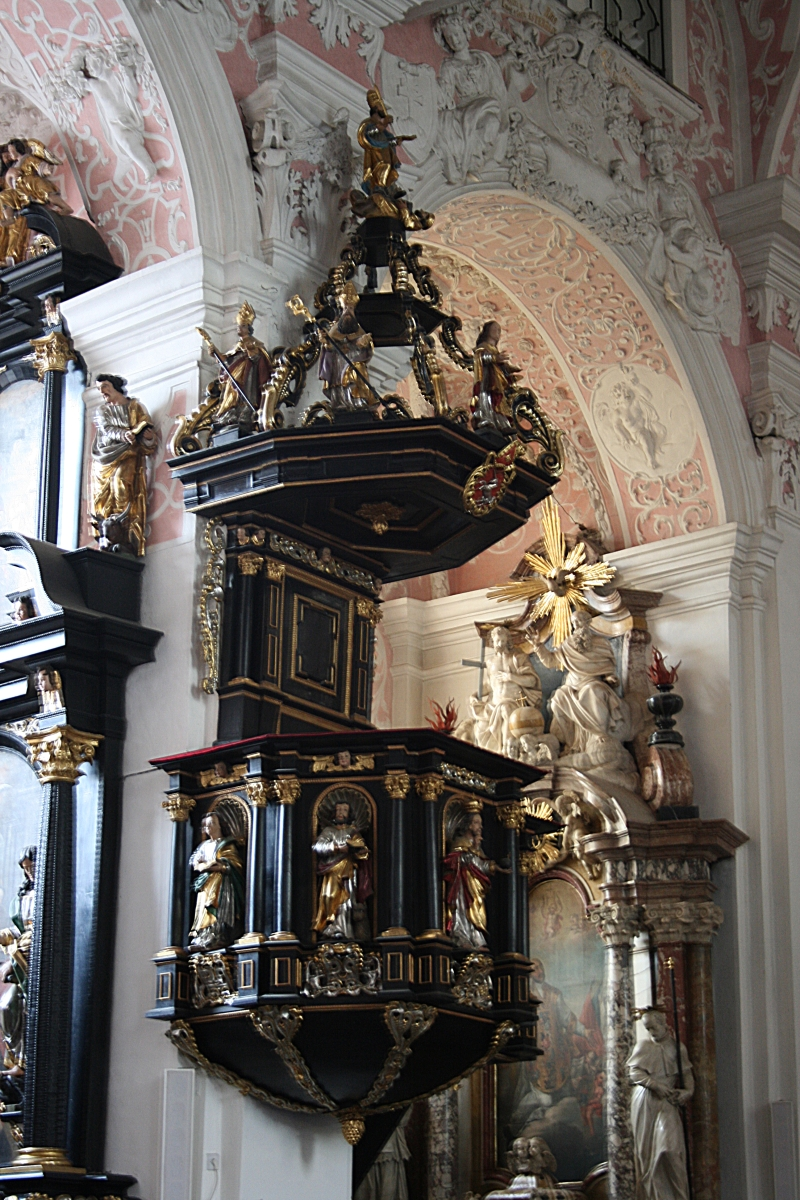
Baroque pulpit

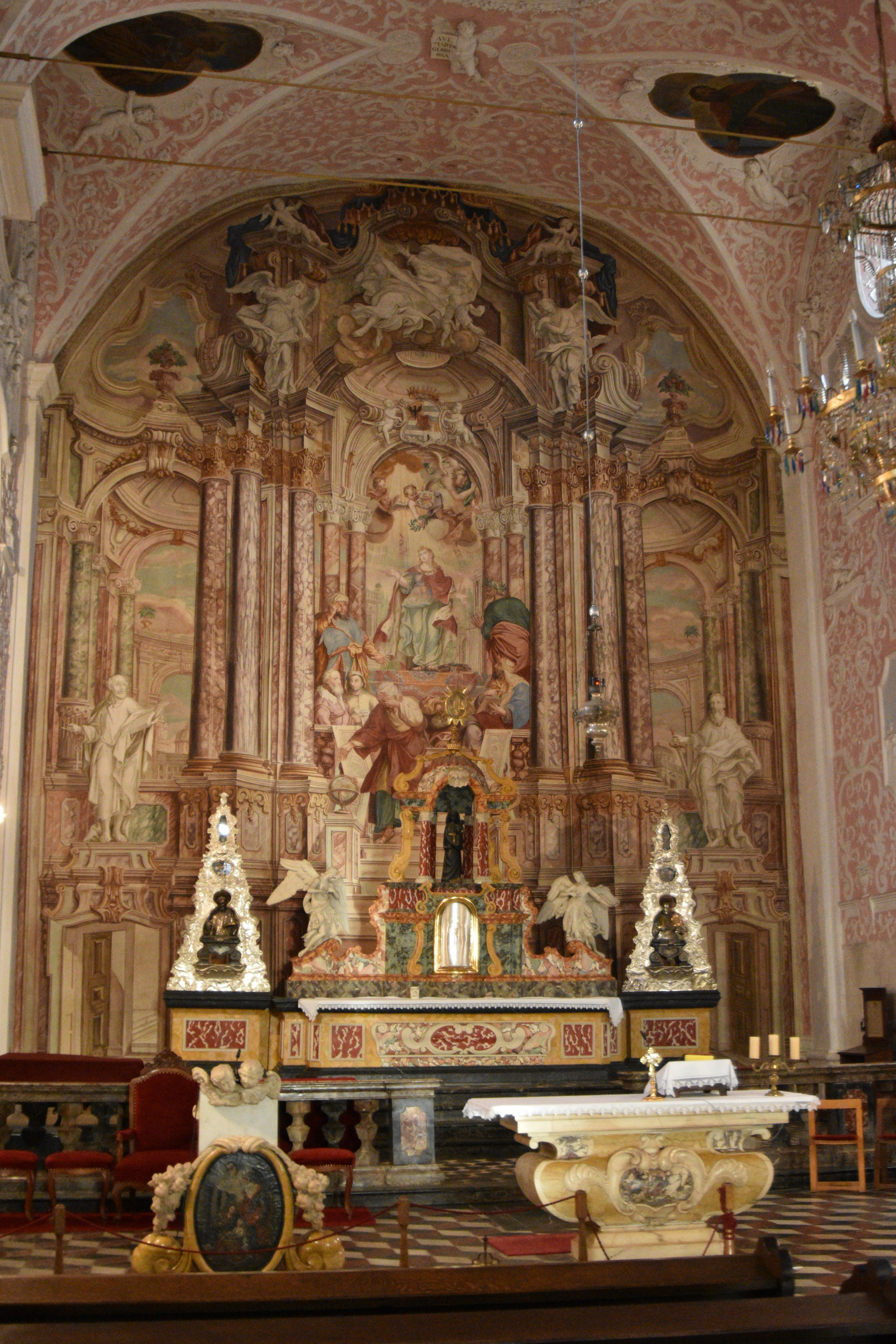
Altar

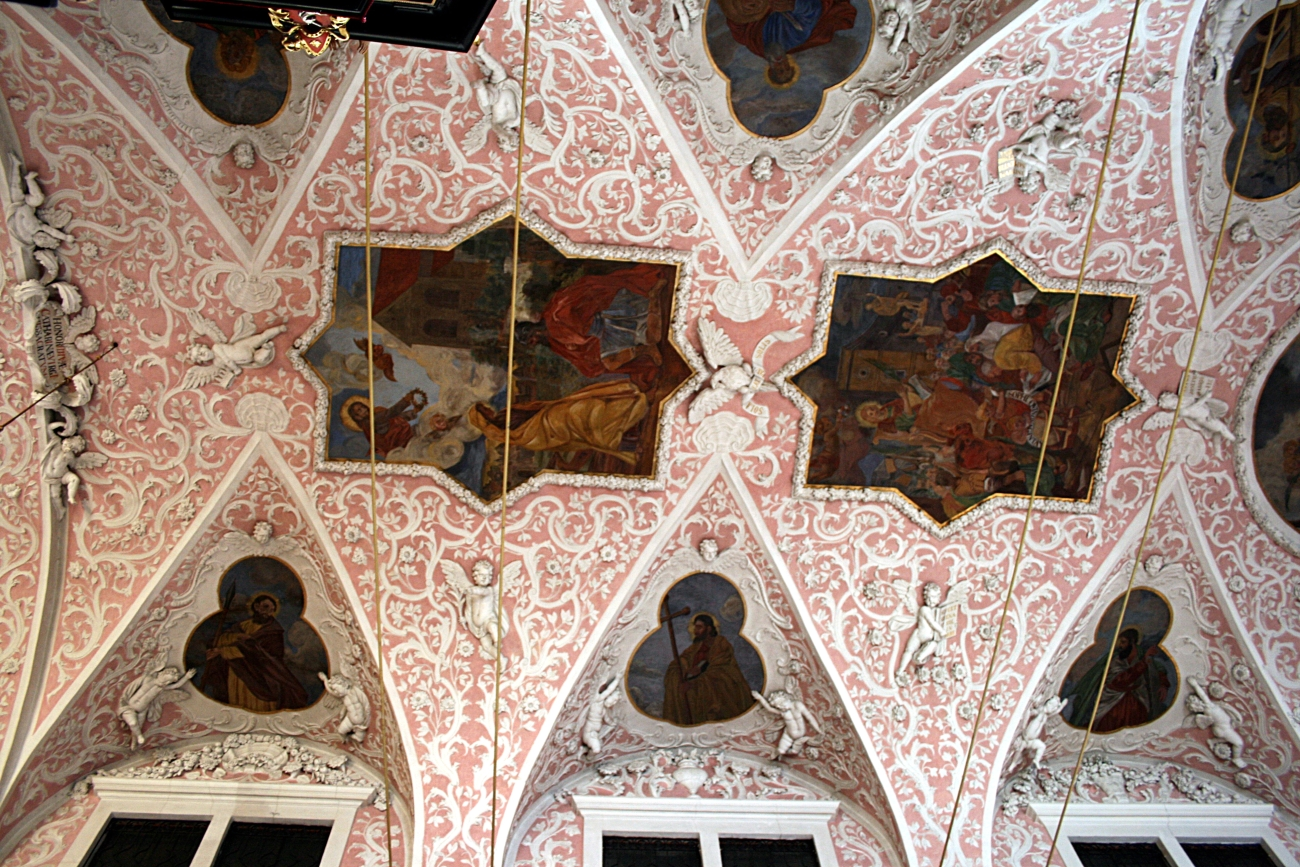
Ceiling

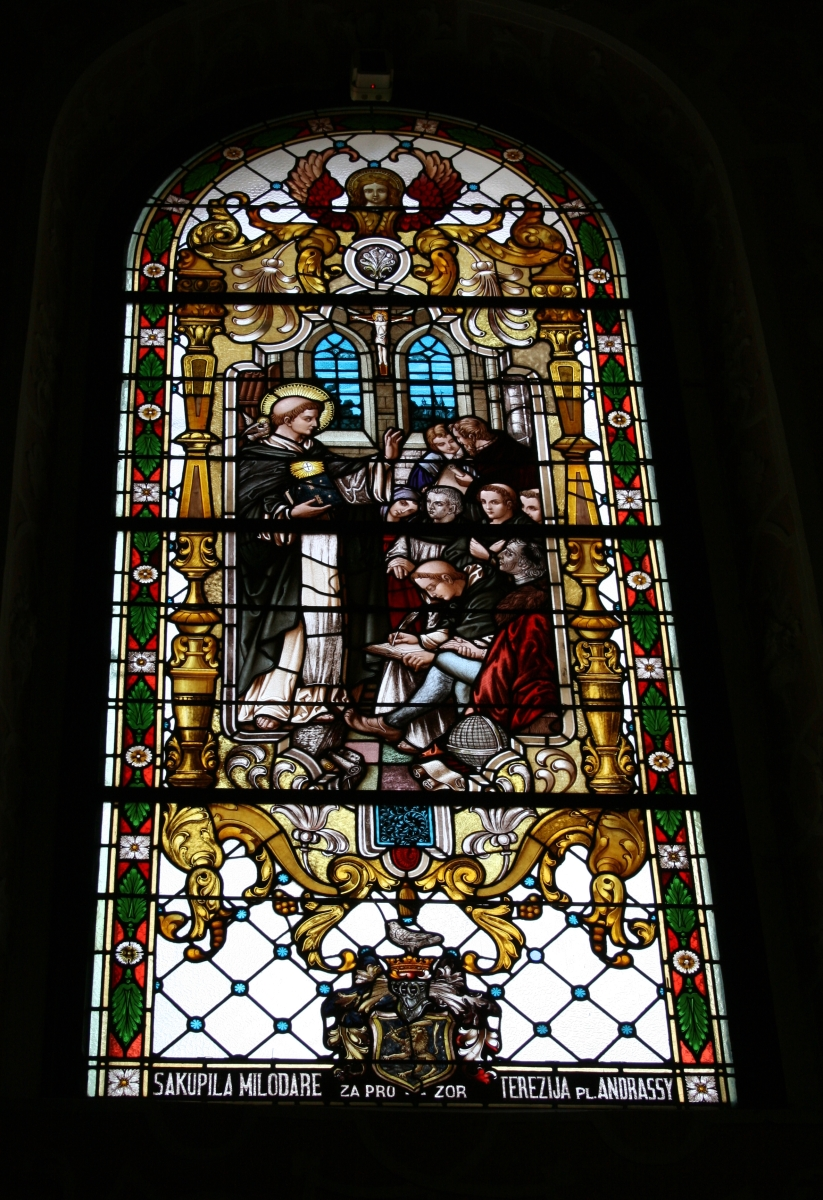
Glass window

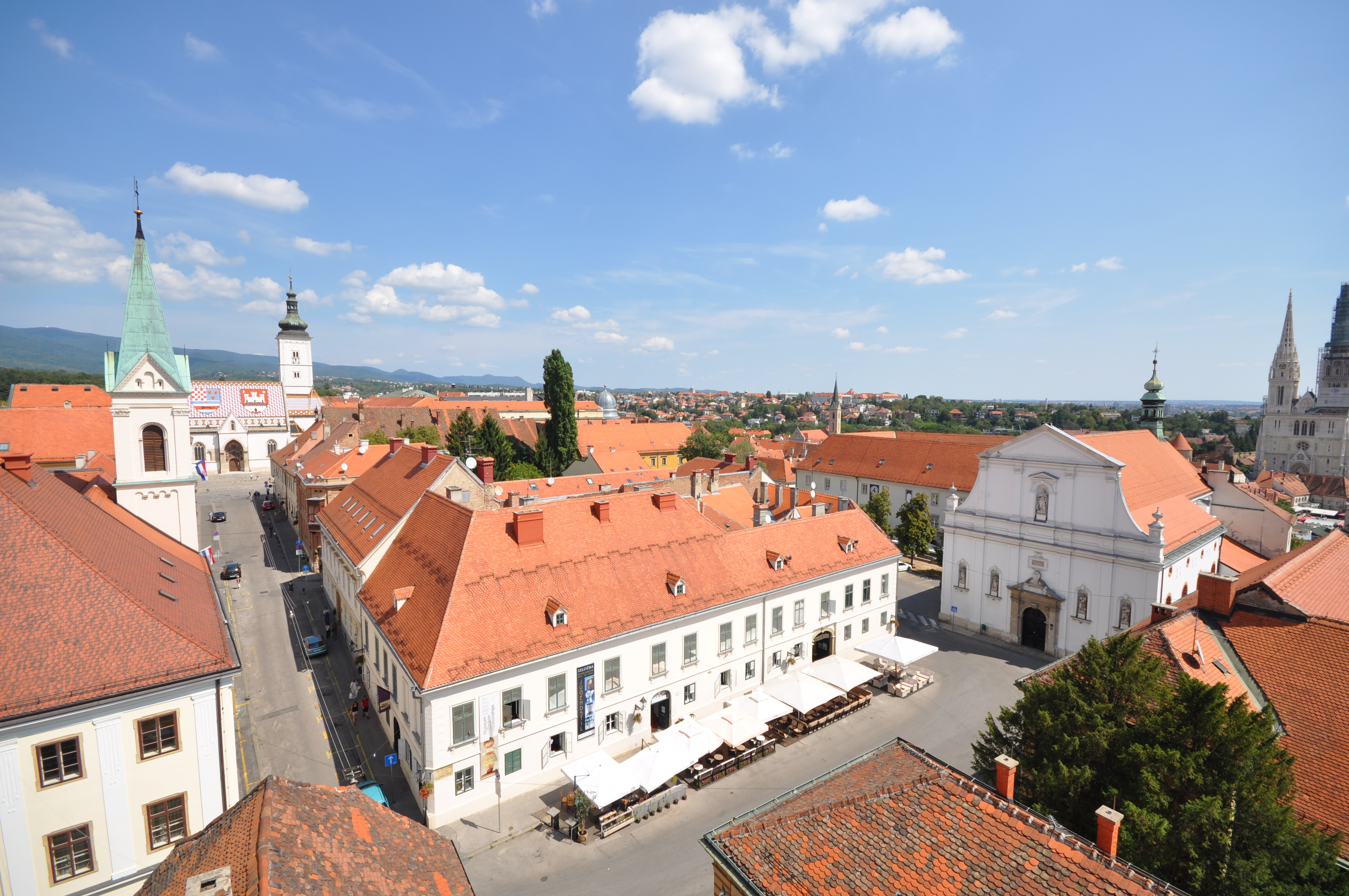
View of Upper town

== See also ==
- History of Zagreb
- List of Jesuit sites
- Zagreb Cathedral

== Sources ==
- Horvat-Levaj, Katarina (December 2008). "Herman Bollé i Crkva sv. Katarine u Zagrebu – korekcija jedne tradicionalne atribucije" [Herman Bollé and the Church of St Catherine in Zagreb – Correction of a Traditional Attribution] (PDF). Radovi Instituta Za Povijest Umjetnosti (in Croatian). 32 (32): 237–250.
