= Nova Ves =

Street in Zagreb, Croatia

Coordinates: 45°49′18″N 15°58′43″E

Nova Ves Nova Ves
- Street / Historic neighbourhood
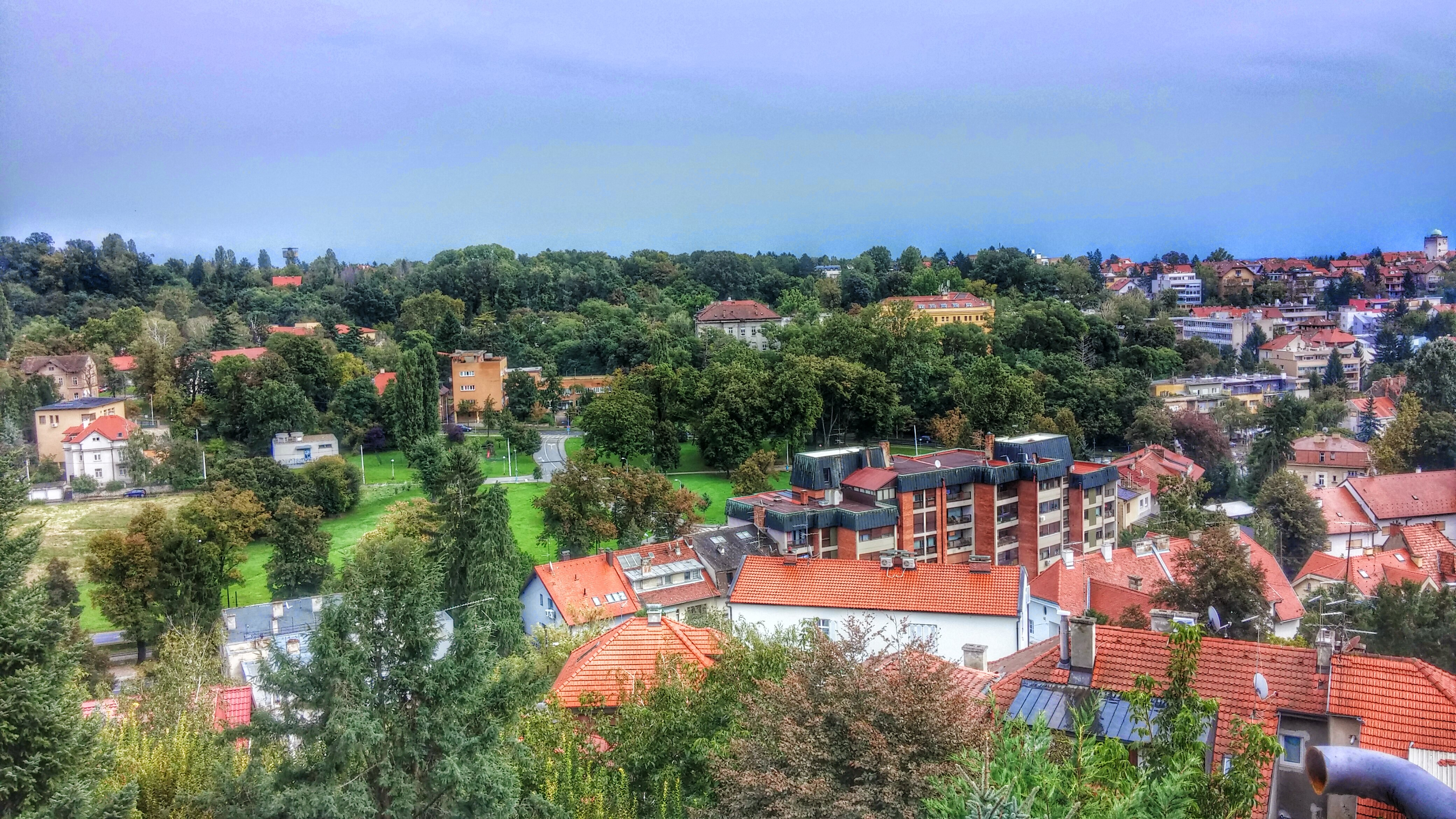
- Nova Ves, central Zagreb
- Interactive map of Nova Ves
- Country: Croatia
- City: Zagreb
- City district: Gornji Grad – Medveščak
- First mentioned: 1334 (as “Villa”, later “Lepa Ves”)

Area
  - Total: 27.52 ha (68.0 acres)

Population
  - Total: 2,397 (2,021)
- Time zone: CET (UTC+1)
  - Summer (DST): CEST (UTC+2)

The Nova Ves (meaning new village in Kajkavian language) is a historic street north of the Kaptol neighborhood in Zagreb, Croatia. It is administratively within the bounds of the Gornji Grad - Medveščak city district. According to the 2001 census, the street and its surrounding area had 3,456 inhabitants. In 2009, it had a population of 3,575. From the first habitation to date, the street has had a rich history as an important part of Zagreb ever since the beginnings of the modern city.

The first mention of the street (as "Lepa Ves") can be found in a document dating to 1334, which calls the settlement a "villa." The area of today's street is mentioned again in a 1361 document as "our new village at St. John's of Zagreb," documenting the nearby church of St. John the Baptist, located near the today's Little Street (Croatian: Mala ulica). The residents of the Nova Ves had rights similar to those of Gornji Grad, i.e. the ability to select their own magistrate, the requirement to pay taxes to the Kaptol Chapter, etc. The street has traditionally been inhabited by prebendaries of the Zagreb Cathedral on Kaptol. It was characteristic for its small wooden houses, some of which can still be found in the parallel Tkalčićeva Street (one remains on the corner of Little Street and Nova Ves). The prebendary houses were demolished by 18th and 19th century and replaced with modern houses made out of brick, most of which are still standing today. It is often mentioned in connection to the Vlaška Ves, today's Vlaška Street, a similar settlement extending east from Kaptol.

Together with the parallel Tkalčićeva Street, Nova Ves is today one of the major tourist sights in central Zagreb. Although being predominantly residential, it houses various restaurants and the shopping malls Centar Kaptol (opened in 2000) and the nearby Cascade/Prebendarski vrtovi (English: Prebendary gardens), opened during Autumn of 2009.
