= Gornji Grad–Medveščak =

District of Zagreb, Croatia

Coordinates: 45°49′41.69″N 15°58′45.68″E

- District of Zagreb
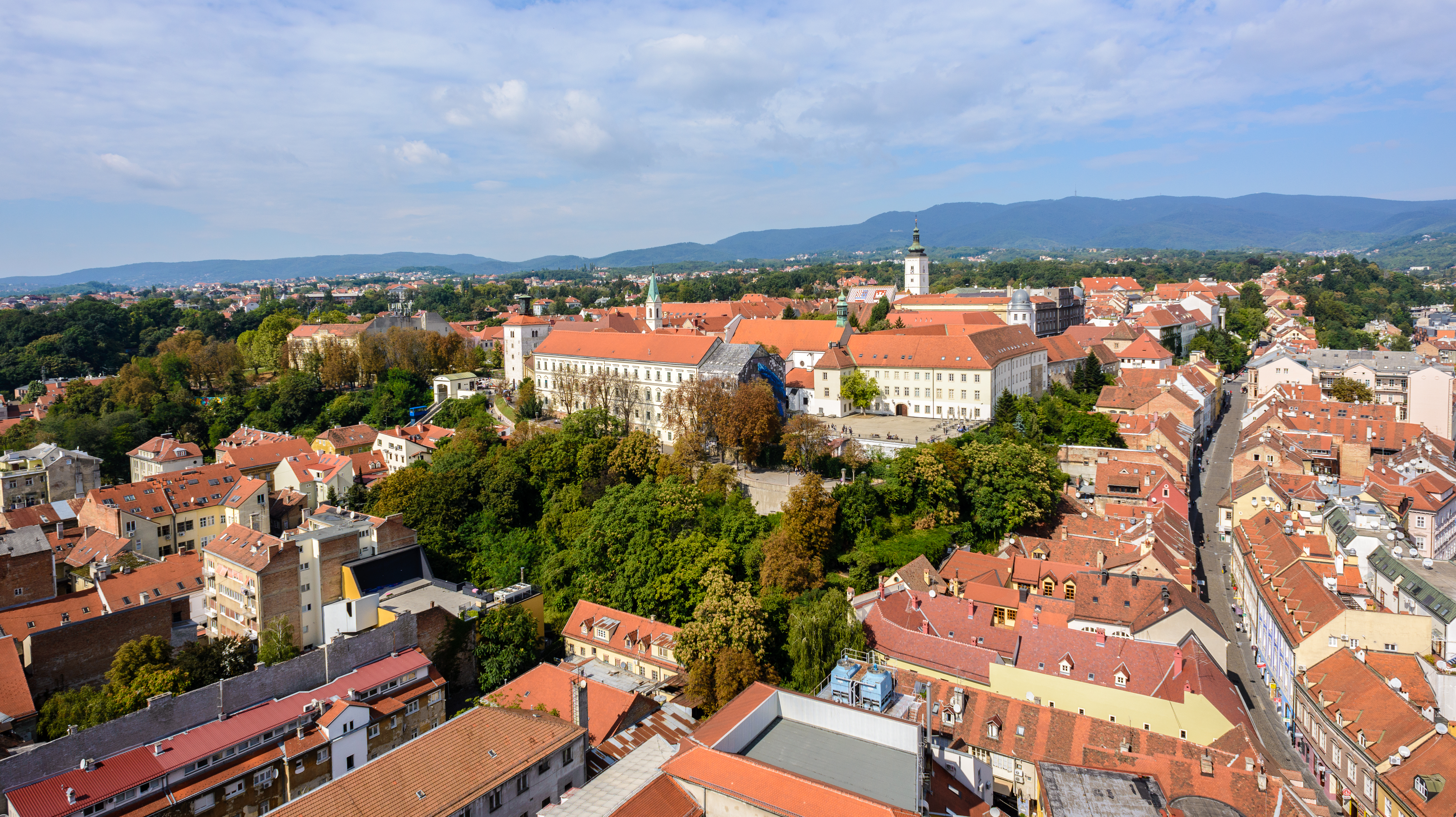
- Panoramic view of Gornji grad

- Location of Gornji Grad–Medveščak, shown in red, within Zagreb
- Interactive map of Gornji Grad–Medveščak
- Country: Croatia
- County: Zagreb
- Modern district founded: 14 December 1999

Area
  - Total: 10.19 km^{2} (3.93 sq mi)

Population (2011)
  - Total: 30,962
  - Density: 3,038/km^{2} (7,870/sq mi)

Gornji Grad–Medveščak (Croatian pronunciation: [ˈɡorɲi ˈɡrad medveʃˈt͡ʃak], lit. 'Upper Town–Medveščak') is one of the districts of Zagreb, Croatia; Gornji Grad translates as "Upper Town", referring to its historical location on city's hillside, being above Donji Grad ("Lower Town"). The district is located in the central part of the city and, according to the 2011 census, it has 30,962 inhabitants spread over 10.19 km^{2} (3.93 sq mi).

Gornji Grad–Medveščak is a district with a high number of historic sites and tourist attractions. Gradec and Kaptol, the two distinct cores of medieval Zagreb, are forming today's Upper Town, and both are parts of this district. The city's Cathedral, the St. Mark's Church and the Croatian Parliament are located in Gornji Grad, as is the popular pedestrian café street Tkalčićeva. There are also other noteworthy objects located outside the oldest historical towns, such as city's monumental cemetery Mirogoj that was built since 1876, located further north.

It is bordered by four other districts: Donji Grad to the south, Črnomerec to the west, Maksimir to the east and Podsljeme to the north.

== Streets and transport ==
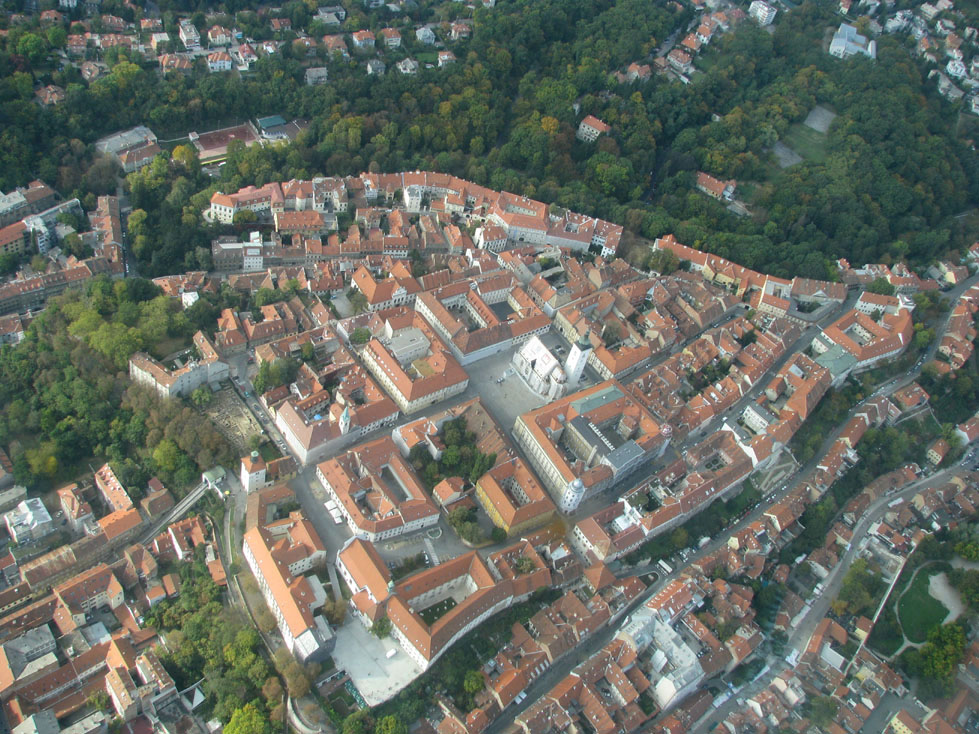
Aerial view of Gornji Grad (Upper town)

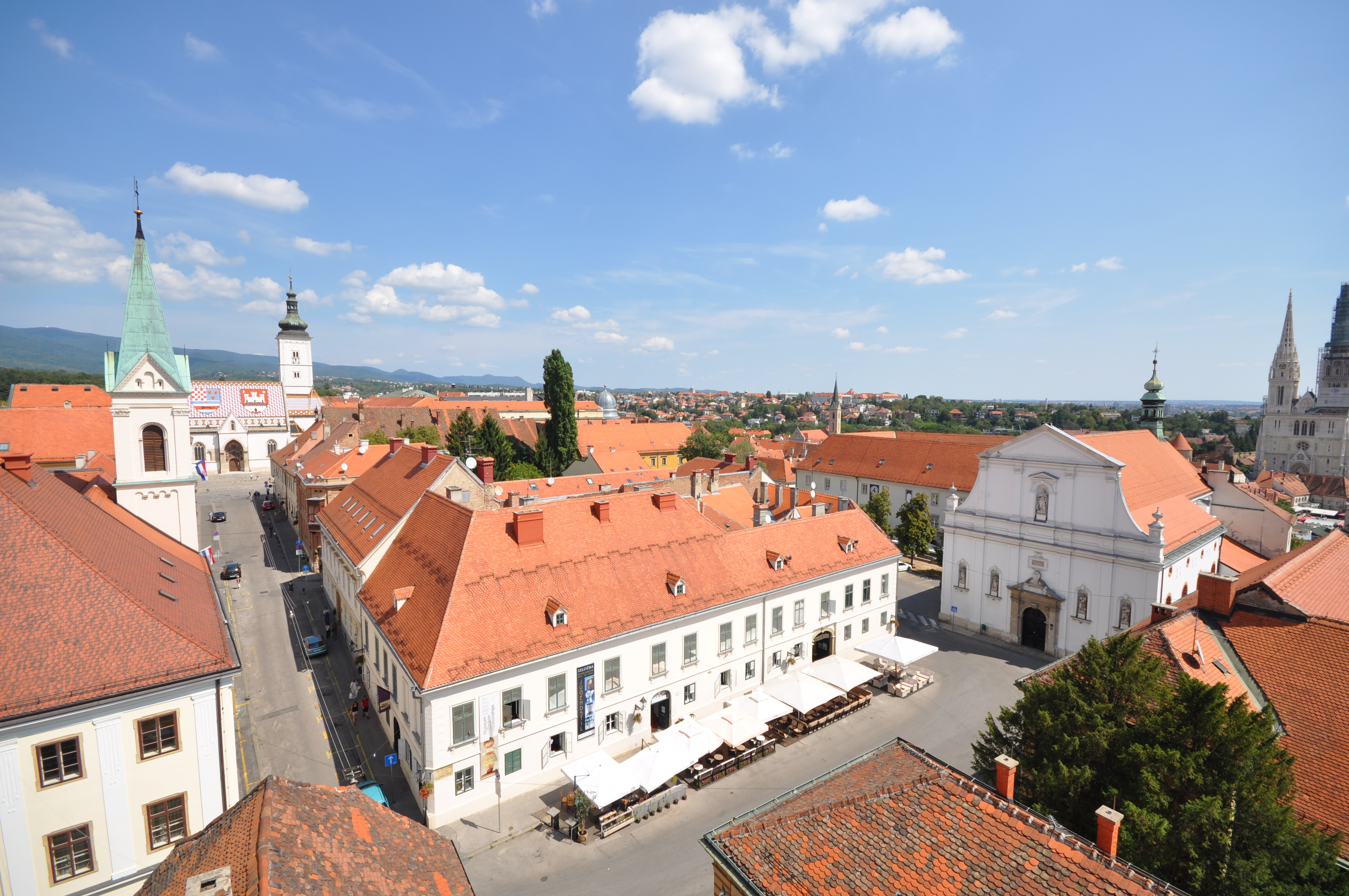
View from Lotrščak Tower with St. Mark's Square, and church, Museum of Broken Relationships, St. Catherine's church, and Zagreb Cathedral

The most important arterial road in Gornji Grad–Medveščak flows between its southern and northern border, starting as a narrow Ribnjak street alongside the Ribnjak park, then widening and changing name to Medveščak street until Gupčeva zvijezda, and again changing name in the north to Ksaver. The road is the main tram connection for Medveščak (lines 8 and 14). The district is also connected in its southern borders by many other important tram lines that run along Ilica, Jurišićeva and Vlaška streets. The short historic Zagreb funicular connects Lower and Upper town, and several less frequent (every 20–45 minutes) bus routes run through the hilly and less populated northern areas.

== Government ==
Belonging to the districts with a population between 30,000 and 50,000, Gornji Grad – Medveščak is governed by a council consisting of 15 councilmen appointed at the 2017 local elections.

== List of neighborhoods in Gornji Grad–Medveščak ==
- Gornji grad
- Gupčeva zvijezda
- Kaptol
- Kraljevec
- Ksaver
- Medveščak
- Mirogoj
- Nova Ves
- Pantovčak
- Petrova
- Ribnjak
- Šalata
- Tkalčićeva Street
- Tuškanac
- Voćarska
- Zelengaj

== See also ==
- History of Zagreb
