= Ivan Tkalčić =

Croatian priest and historian

Ivan Krstitelj Tkalčić (Note: The name Ivan Krstitelj is equivalent to English John the Baptist or French Jean-Baptiste.) (Croatian pronunciation: [ǐʋan kr̂stiteʎ tkâːlt͡ʃit͡ɕ]; 4 May 1840 – 11 May 1905) was a Croatian historian, Catholic priest, and prebendary.

Tkalčić was born on 4 May 1840 in Zagreb, Kingdom of Croatia, to father Janko from Samobor and mother Bara (née Martinjakova). He was ordained a priest on 7 September 1862, becoming a curate in Sisak. On 10 October 1867, when he became the prebendary of the Zagreb Cathedral, a post he held until his death on 11 May 1905. His first publication was an article in Narodne novine in 1859. This was followed by many works pertaining history, especially the history of Zagreb and the Croatian church. Tkalčić became a corresponding member of the Croatian Academy of Sciences and Arts (then Yugoslav Academy of Sciences and Arts) in 1875, and a full member in 1882. From then onwards he held the position of the academy's librarian until 1892 and archivist in 1896.

He is the namesake of Tkalčićeva Street in Zagreb.

== Incomplete list of works ==
- Hrvatska povjestnica, printed by Dragutin Albrecht, Zagreb, 1861 (2nd edition in 1862; reprint by Fortuna, Strmec Samoborski, 2011)
- Na uspomenu tisuću-godišnjice sv. Cyrilla i Methoda slovjenskih apostolah [In the memory of the thousandth anniversary of St. Cyril and Method, Slavic apostles], printed and financed by Dragutin Albrecht, Zagreb, 1863
- Severila, ili Slika iz progonstva kršćanah u Sisku: historična pripoviest iz četvrtoga stoljeća [Severila, or a Picture of the persecution of Christians in Sisak: a historical novella from the 4th century], printed and financed by Albrecht, Zagreb, 1866
- Sumporne toplice kod Varaždina u Hrvatskoj [Sulphur spa at Varaždin in Croatia, referring to Varaždinske Toplice], Albrecht, Zagreb, 1869
- Poviest Hrvatah [The History of Croats], financed by Albrecht's and Fiedler's bookstore, Zagreb, 1870
- Povjestni spomenici zagrebačke biskupije = Monumenta historica episcopatus Zagrabiensis [Historical monuments of the Zagreb bishopric], printed by Karl Albrecht, 2 volumes, Zagreb, 1873–74
- Prvostolna crkva zagrebačka [The cathedral of Zagreb], Dionička tiskara, Zagreb, 1880
- Ivan arcidjakon Gorički: domaći pisac u IV. vieku [John, the Archdeacon of Gorica: a local writer in the 4th century], Dionička tiskara, Zagreb, 1886
- Povjestni spomenici slobodnog kraljevskog grada Zagreba priestolnice Kraljevine dalmatinsko-hrvatsko-slavonske [Historical monuments of the free royal city of Zagreb, the capital of the Kingdom of Croatia, Dalmatia and Slavonia], 11 volumes, 1889–1905
- Slob. kralj. glavni grad Zagreb do svršetka XIV. vieka [Free royal city of Zagreb before the end of the 14th century], printed by Karl Albrecht, Zagreb, 1889
- Parnice proti vješticam u Hrvatskoj [Witch trials in Croatia], Zagreb, 1891
- Izprave o progonu vješticah u Hrvatskoj [Documents about witch-hunts in Croatia], Dionička tiskara, Zagreb, 1892
- Slob. kralj. glavni grad Zagreb u XV. vieku [Free royal city of Zagreb in the 15th century], printed by Karl Albrecht, Zagreb, 1895
- Slavensko bogoslužje u Hrvatskoj, Dionička tiskara, Zagreb, 1904
