= Kaptol, Zagreb =

Part of Zagreb, archbishop's seat

Kaptol
- Historic neighborhood of Zagreb
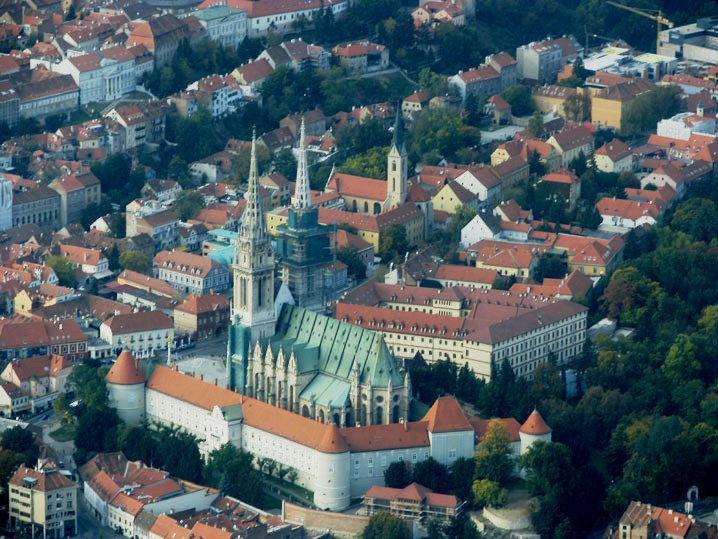
- Zagreb Cathedral, the dominant landmark of Kaptol
- Interactive map of Kaptol
- Coordinates: 45.815°N 15.979°E
- Country: Croatia
- City: Zagreb
- City district: Gornji Grad–Medveščak
- Established: 1094
- Named for: Latin capitulum (cathedral chapter)

Population (2011)
  - Total: 1,523
- Time zone: UTC+1 (CET)
  - Summer (DST): UTC+2 (CEST)
- Website: www.zagreb.hr

Kaptol is a historic neighborhood of Zagreb, Croatia, located in the Upper Town area. It is the ecclesiastical center of the Roman Catholic Archdiocese of Zagreb and the seat of the Archbishop of Zagreb. Its most prominent landmark is Zagreb Cathedral, which dominates the historic district.

The settlement originated in 1094 with the establishment of the Diocese of Zagreb and developed as a separate medieval town alongside neighboring Gradec. Throughout its history, Kaptol served as the religious and administrative center of the Catholic Church in the region. Today, it forms part of the city district of Gornji Grad–Medveščak.

Due to its historical and ecclesiastical significance, the term Kaptol is also used as a metonym for the leadership of the Roman Catholic Church in Croatia.

== History ==
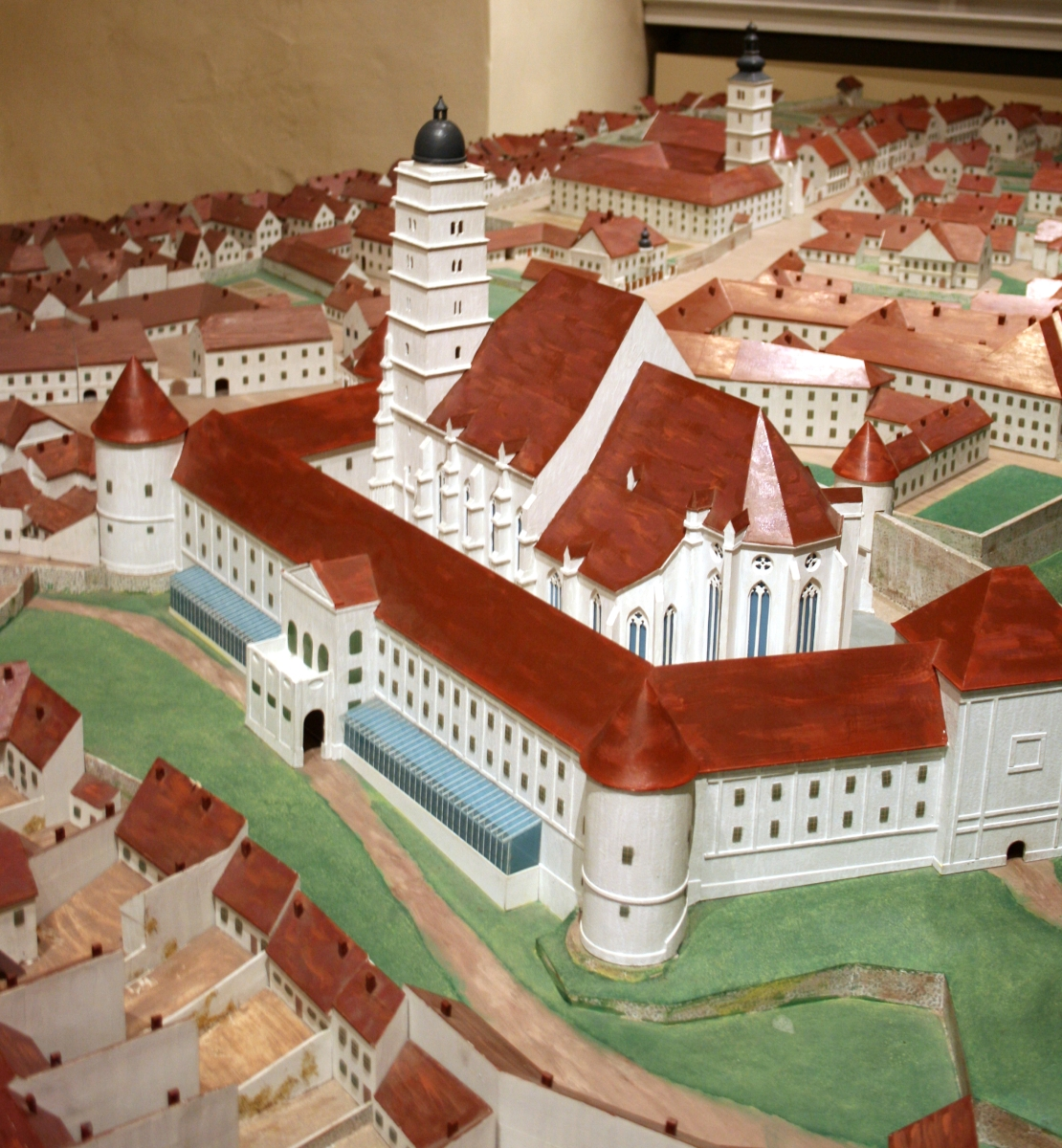
Miniature model of Zagreb Cathedral on Kaptol with the old bell-tower

The existence of Kaptol, the settlement on the east slope, was confirmed in 1094 when King Ladislaus founded the Zagreb diocese. The bishop, his residence and the Zagreb Cathedral had their seat in the southeast part of the Kaptol hill. Vlaška Ves was situated in the close vicinity of the cathedral. Being under the bishop's jurisdiction, it was first mentioned in 1198. Kaptol Street ran from the south to the north across the Kaptol terrace with canons' residences arranged in rows alongside, and these residences are largely preserved as the Kaptol manors in Zagreb. As the Latin word for a group or body of canons is "capitulum" (kaptol), it is clear how Kaptol got its name. The canons also ruled this settlement.

The cathedral was consecrated in 1217, but later in 1242 it was badly damaged during the Mongol invasion. After 1263 it was restored and rebuilt. As a settlement, Kaptol's shape was an unsymmetrical rectangle, which had a southern entrance in Bakačeva Street, and ended at its north end near the present day Kaptol School (Miroslav Krleža Elementary School).

In the Middle Ages, Kaptol had no fortifications. It was merely enclosed with wooden fences or palisades, which were repeatedly destroyed and rebuilt. The defensive walls and towers around Kaptol were built between 1469 and 1473. The Prislin Tower near the Kaptol School is one of the best-preserved from those times. In 1593 the Turks reached Sisak trying to capture it but were defeated there. Therefore, fearing the Turkish invasion, the bishop of Zagreb had the fortifications built around the cathedral and his residence. The defensive towers and walls built between 1512 and 1520 have been preserved until the present day except those that directly faced the front of the cathedral situated at Kaptol Square. This section of the wall was pulled down in 1907.

In the 13th century two Gothic churches were built in Kaptol, St. Francis with the Franciscan monastery, and St. Mary, which underwent considerable reconstruction works in the 17th and the 18th centuries. St Francis' church has stained glass windows with flowery motifs designed by the Croatian painter Ivo Dulčić.

In Opatovina, small dwelling houses of former Kaptol inhabitants can still be seen, but at Dolac a number of little and narrow streets were torn down in 1926 when the today's market was built. In 1334 the canons of Zagreb established a colony of Kaptol serfs in the vicinity of their residences, north of Kaptol. That was the beginning of a new settlement called Nova Ves (the present day Nova Ves Street).

== Neighbourhood ==
Kaptol is today part of the Gornji Grad - Medveščak city district. It mainly faces the Kaptol Street, lying atop of the Ribnjak Park in the east. The Kaptol Centar shopping mall is located in Nova Ves.

The central part of Kaptol is part of the local government "August Cesarec" that has a total population of 1,523 (2011).

== Views of Kaptol ==
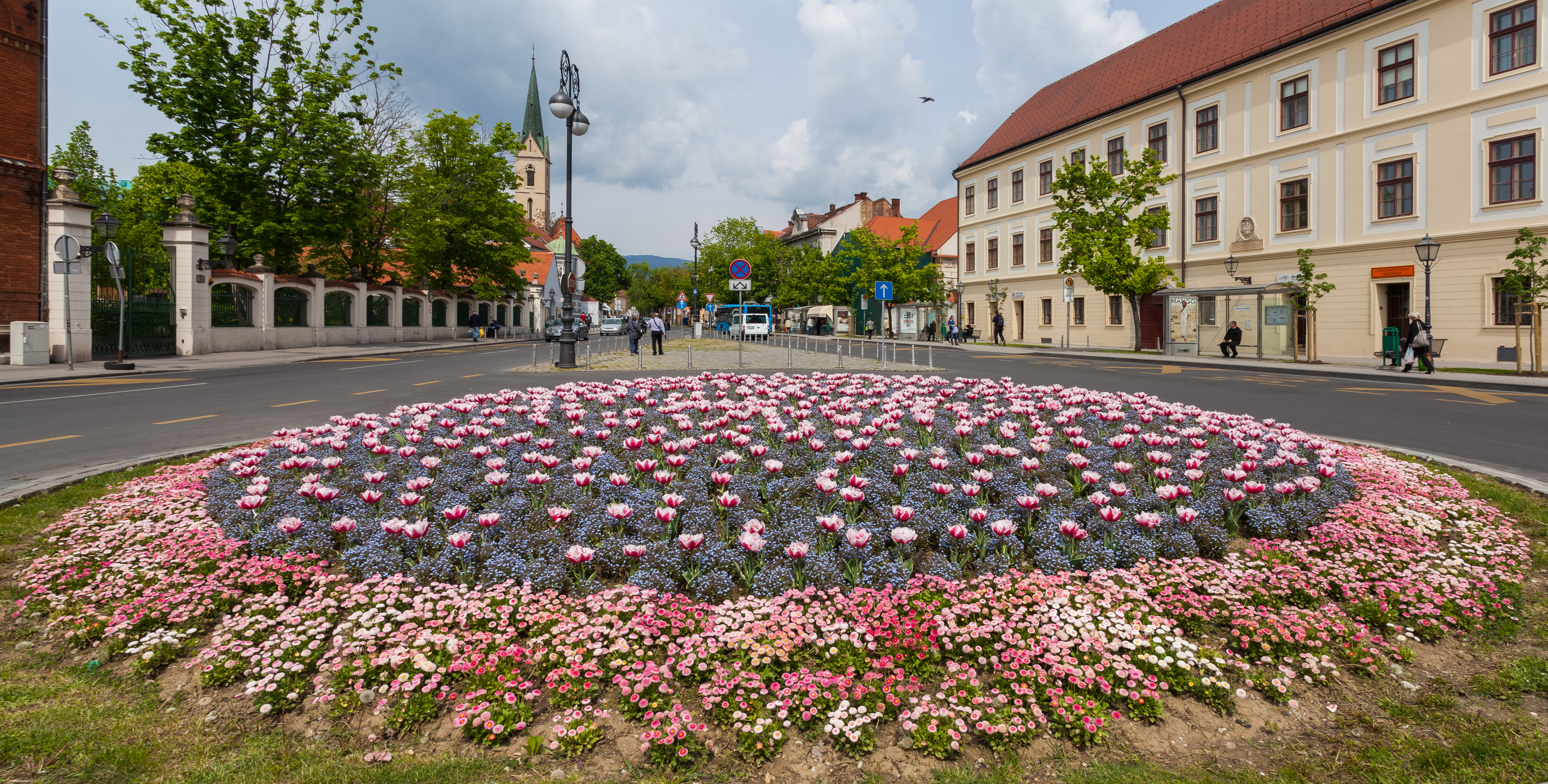
Kaptol

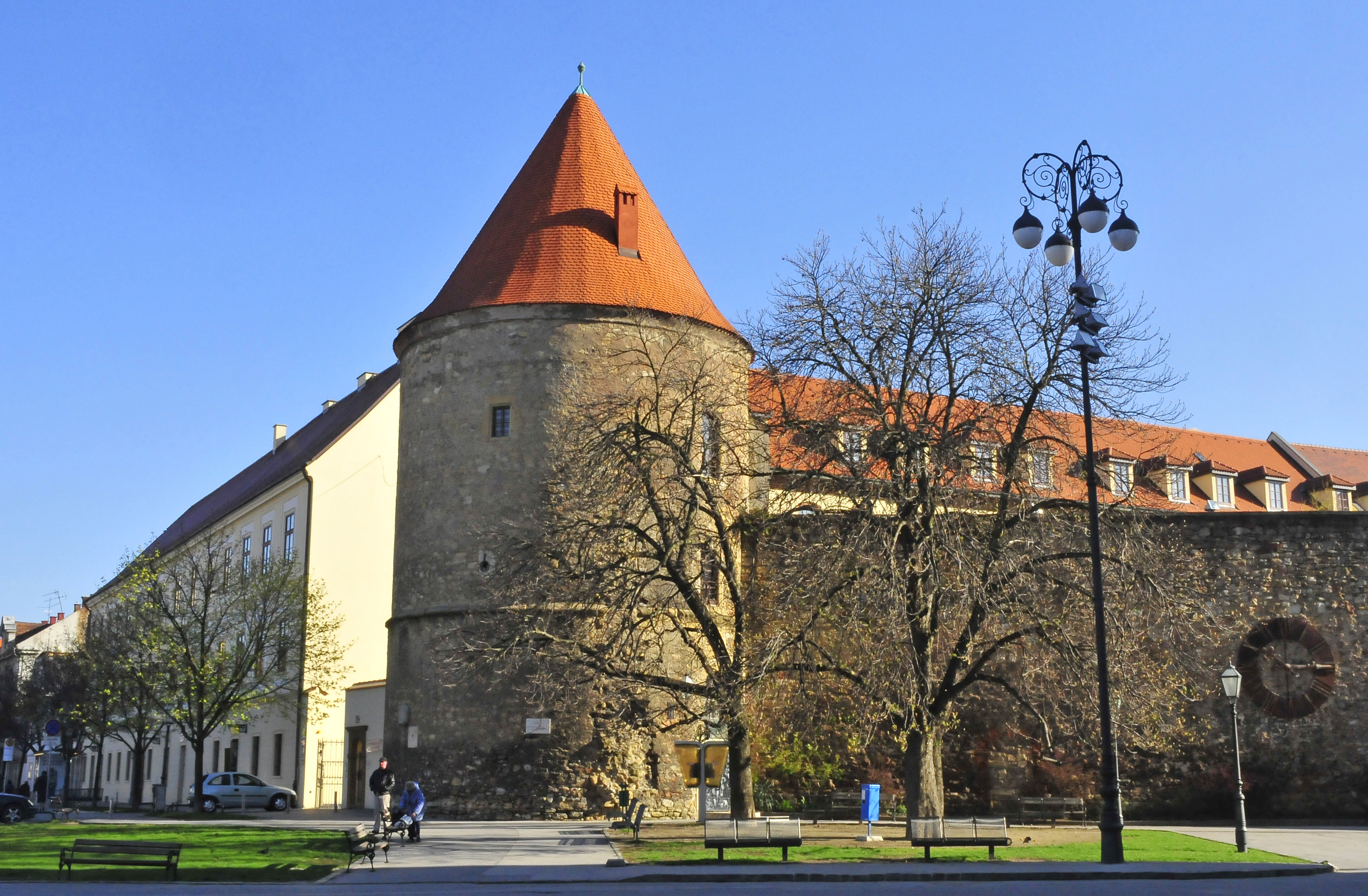
Kaptol Fortress

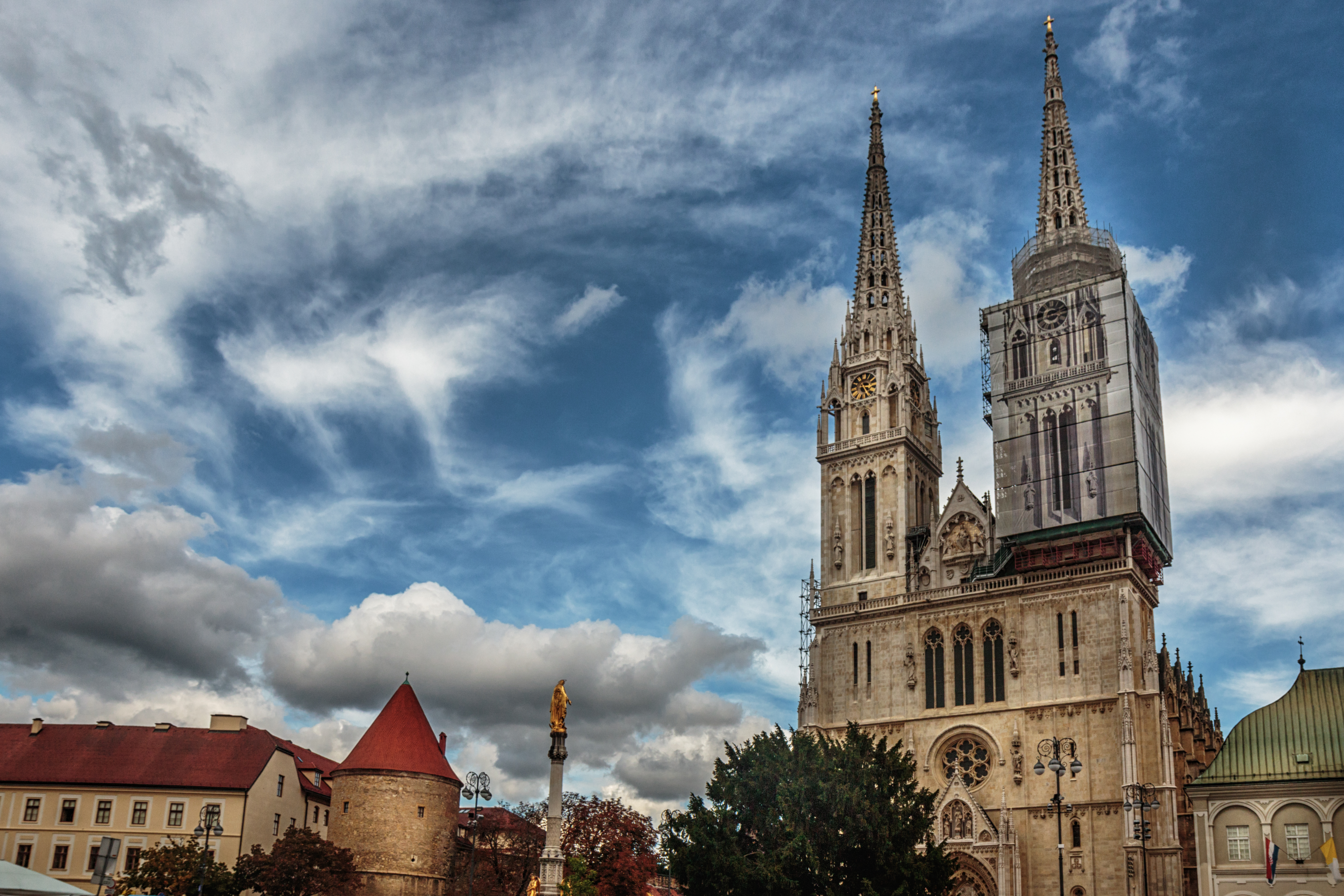
Zagreb Cathedral

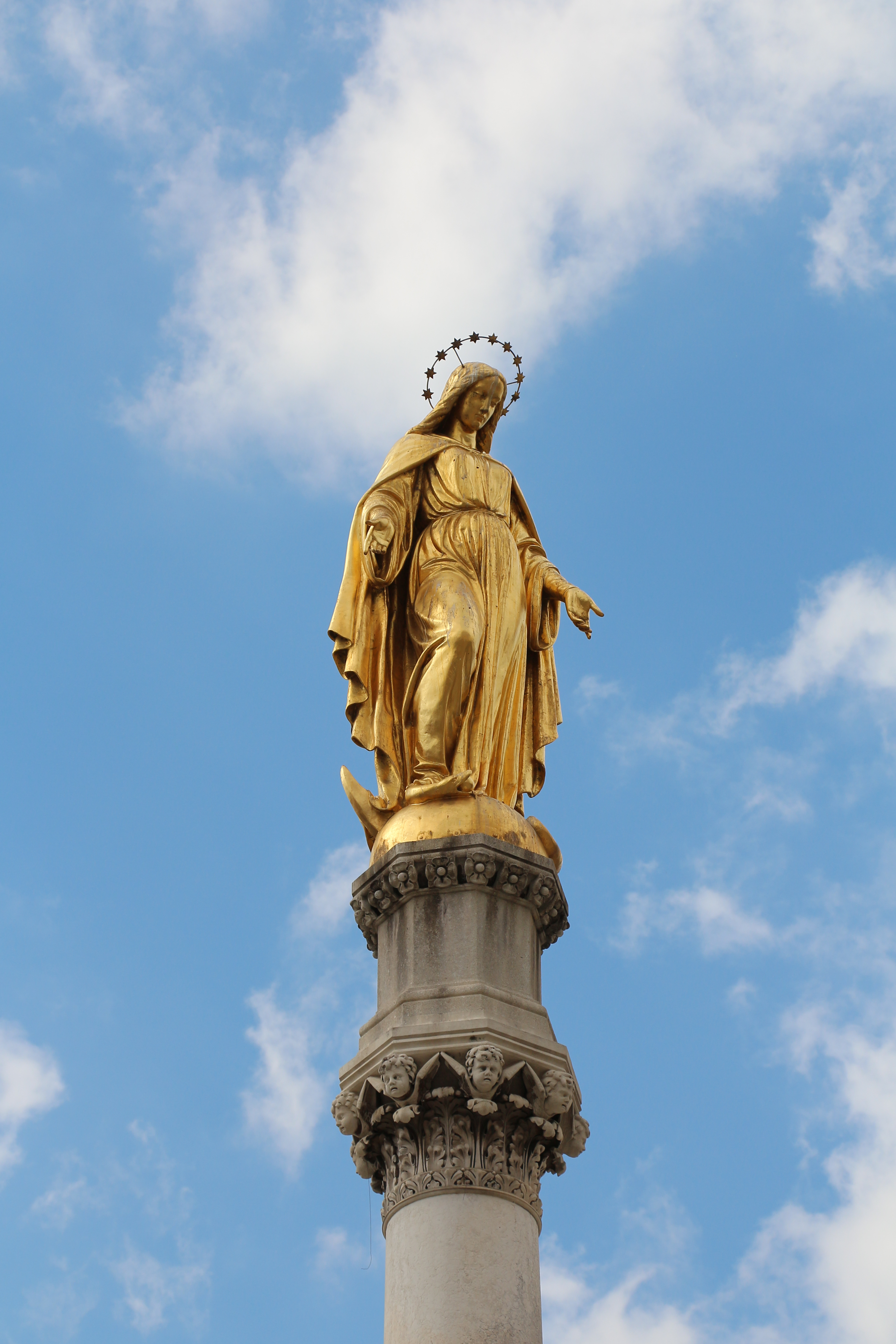
Virgin Mary column in Kaptol

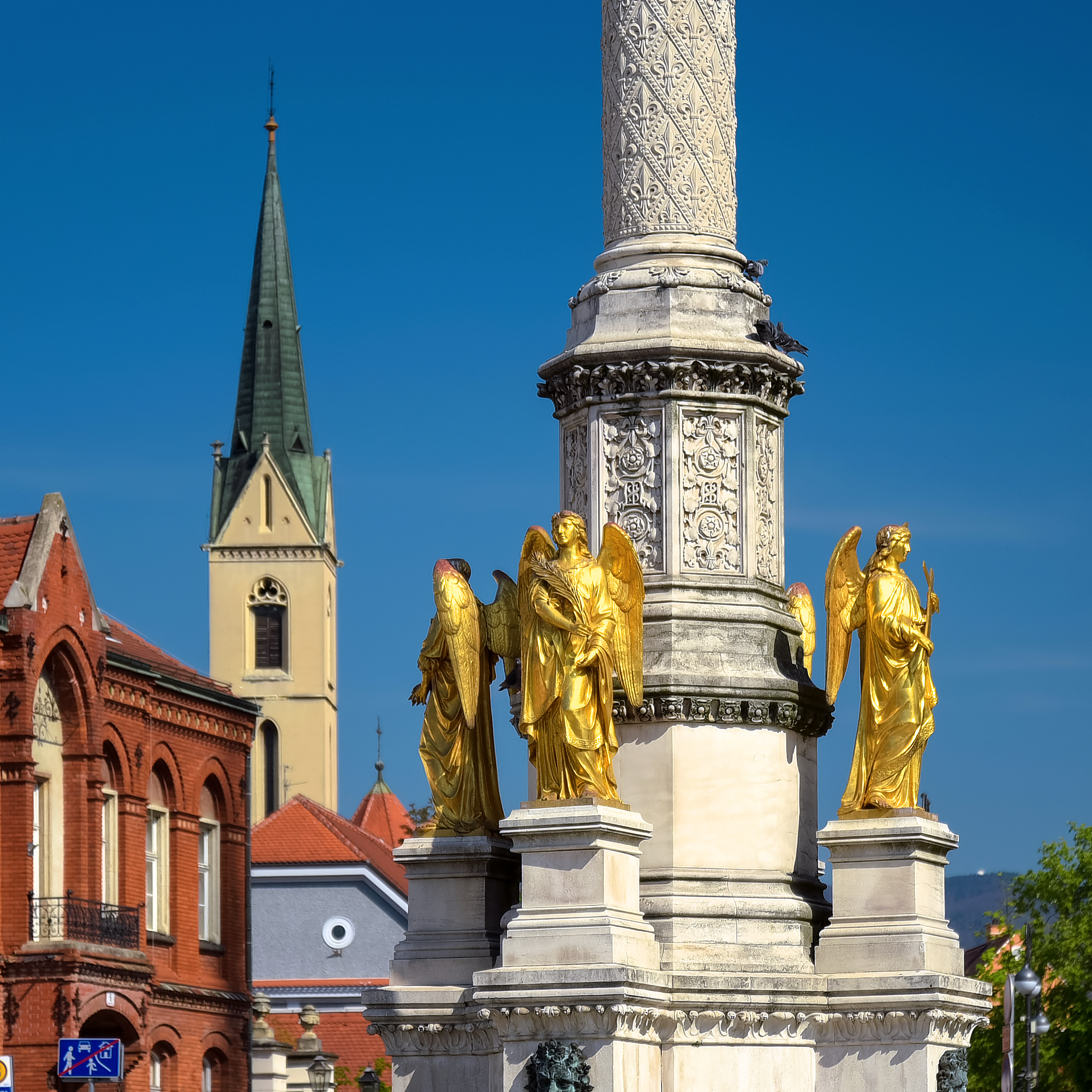
Angels of Virgin Mary column

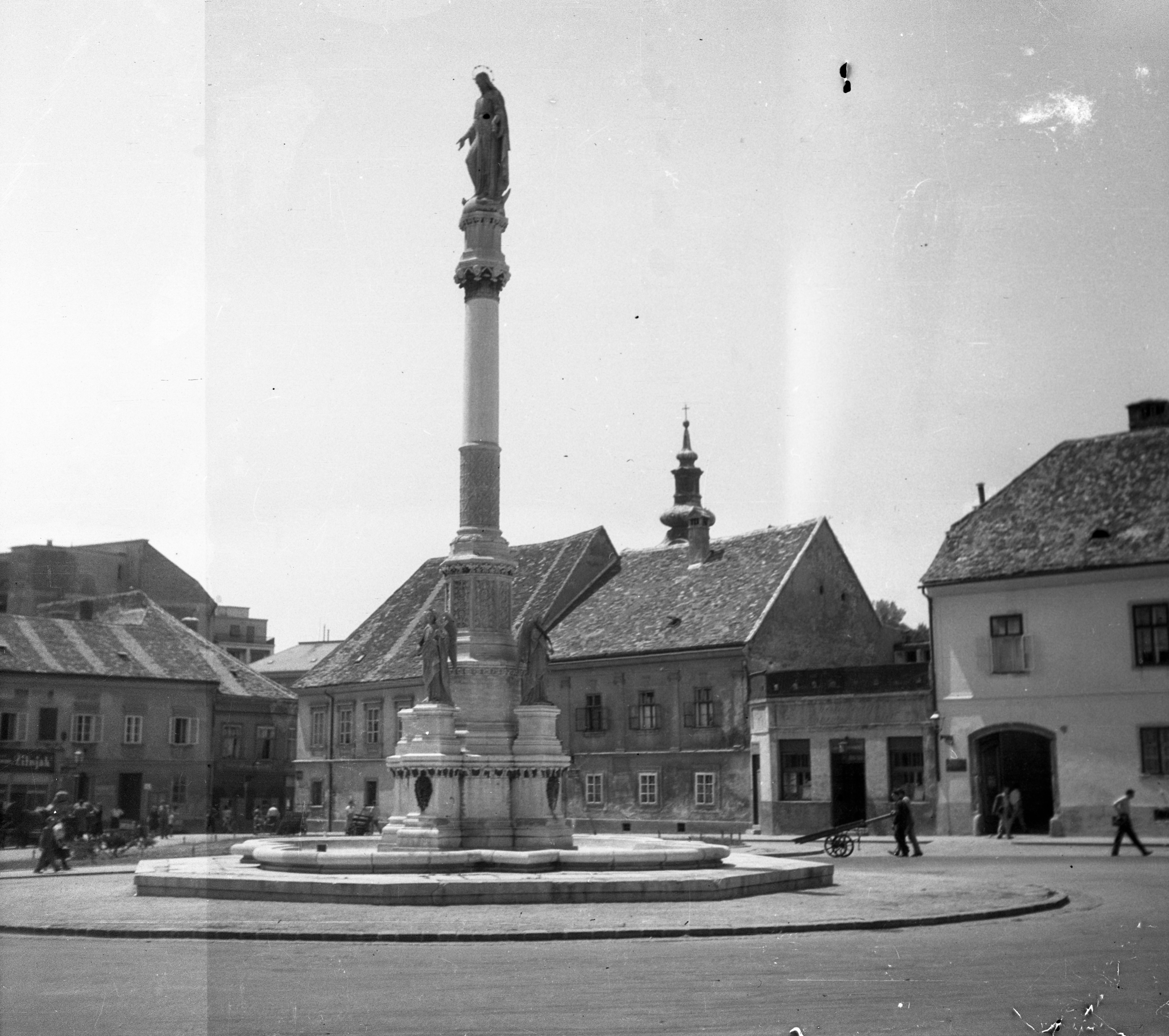
Kaptol Square in 1957

== See also ==
- History of Croatia
- History of Zagreb
- Ban Jelačić Square
- Gradec
- St. Mark's Church
