= Timeline of Zagreb =

The following is a timeline of the history of the city of Zagreb, Croatia.

== Prior to 19th century ==
- 1st century – Andautonia was founded
- 5th century – Andautonia was destroyed
- 1094 – Diocese of Zagreb established by Ladislaus I of Hungary; Cathedral construction begins (approximate date).
- 1242
  - Gradec and Gornji Grad besieged by Tatars.
  - Golden Bull issued by Béla IV of Hungary; Gradec becomes a royal free city.
- 1261 – Gradec fortification walls constructed.
- 1368 – Population: 2,810.
- 1476 – Works begin on Kaptol fortification in August. Bishop Osvald of Zagreb Diocese permits residence of laypeople in Kaptol for defense purposes, leading to resistance among clergy.
- 1479 – Kaptol fortification walls completed.
- 1557 – Croatian Parliament convenes at Gradec.
- 1573 – Matija Gubec, leader of the failed Croatian–Slovene peasant revolt, is executed.
- 1607
  - Jesuit high school founded.
  - National library founded.
- 1621 – Zagreb designated seat of Ban of Croatia.
- 1631 - Building of the students' seminary completed
- 1632 – St. Catherine's Church built.
- 1647 – Foundation directed towards financing poor students from Croatian regions, Frangepaneum, established by Nikola IX Frankopan
- 1651 – Catastrophic flood of Medveščak stream in July destroys all houses in Tkalčićeva Street. 52 people drown.
- 1662 – Zrinski palace built
- 1669 – Jesuit Academy established.
- 1670 – Fran Krsto Frankopan, poet and conspirator, visits the city in order to secure support from the citizens during the Magnate conspiracy
- 1695 – Pavao Ritter Vitezović starts writing and publishing pamphlets, poetic, historiographical works on Saint Mark's Square
- 1742 – Population: 5,600.
- 1757 – Tituš Brezovački, notable dramatist and poet is born
- 1758 - First Croatian arithmetics textbook Arithmetika Horvatzka, written by Mihalj Šilobod Bolšić, was published
- 1764 - Vojković palace built
- 1771 – Ephemerides Zagrabienses, the first Croatian newspaper, begins publication.
- 1776 – Royal council relocates to Zagreb from Varaždin.
- 1785 – The first bridge over Sava river is built.
- 1786 – A large fire sweeps through Gradec, Kaptol and Tkalčićeva Street.
- 1794
  - Maksimir Park opens to the public
  - Construction begins on foundation hospital on Harmica square (today's Ban Jelačić Square)
- 1797 – Amadeo's theatre founded.

== 19th century ==
- 1805 – Population: 7,706.
- 1827 – Musikverein founded.
- 1829 – Music school established by Agram Musical Society.
- 1833 – City Hall rebuilt.
- 1835 – Novine Horvatzke newspaper begins publication.
- 1845 – July 29: Protest quelled by Austrian Imperial Army.
- 1846
  - Sisters of Charity Hospital established.
  - Franz Liszt visits Zagreb and performs in the old theatre on St. Mark's Square.
- 1850
  - Telegraph service is introduced.
  - Population: 16,036.
- 1851
  - Janko Kamauf becomes mayor.
  - Gradec and Zagreb merged.
- 1852 – Roman Catholic Archdiocese established.
- 1860 – National Theatre established.
- 1862 – Railway begins operating.
- 1866 – Orthodox Cathedral built.
- 1867
  - City designated capital of Croatia-Slavonia.
  - Synagogue consecrated.
- 1871 – Philharmonic Orchestra founded.
- 1874 - Franz Josef University founded.
- 1875 - Art Society founded.
- 1876 – Mirogoj Cemetery established.
- 1877 – Grič cannon begins daily firing.
- 1878 – Waterworks begin operating.
- 1880
  - Earthquake.
  - Museum of Arts and Crafts founded.
- 1882 – Vranyczany Palace built.
- 1884 – Strossmayer Gallery of Old Masters opens.
- 1887 – Public telephone network is established.
- 1889 – Rudolf barracks completed.
- 1890 – Population: 38,742.
- 1891
  - The first Zagreb tramway, a horsecar, begins operating.
  - Botanical Garden opened to public.
- 1892 – Zagreb Glavni railway station built.
- 1893 – Funicular begins operating.
- 1895 – Croatian National Theatre opened, during the visit of Emperor Franz Joseph.
- 1898
  - Art Pavilion inaugurated.
  - Krvavi Most bridge closes. The bridge today remains as a pedestrian street, as the Medveščak stream, which used to flow under, was covered and built over.
- 1900 – Population: 57,930 (61,002 with garrison).

== 20th century ==
- 1901
  - Earthquake.
  - Taxi service established.
  - Women are allowed to enroll at the Faculty of Philosophy of the University of Zagreb.
- 1903 – Observatory inaugurated.
- 1904 – Kallina House (residence) built.
- 1905 – National Gallery for Croatian Art established.
- 1906 – Works on introducing street lighting begin.
- 1907
  - City Museum established.
  - Electric power plant built.
- 1909
  - Airfield begins operating near Črnomerec.
  - Zagreb Fair established (as Zagrebački zbor).
- 1910 – Electric tramway begins operating.
- 1912 – Stadion Maksimir opens.
- 1918
  - City becomes part of the newly established Kingdom of Serbs, Croats and Slovenes
  - 1918 protest in Zagreb against the new kingdom (December Victims)
- 1919
  - Zagreb Quartet founded.
  - Ethnographic Museum founded.
- 1921 – Stadion Concordije built.
- 1922
  - City becomes capital of Zagreb Oblast.
  - Archdiocesan Grand Gymnasium founded.
- 1924
  - Stadion Koturaska built.
  - NK Maksimir football club formed.
- 1925
  - Zoo opens.
  - Regent Esplanade hotel built.
- 1926 – Radio-stanica Zagreb (now Croatian Radio) begins broadcasting.
- 1931 – Population: 185,581.
- 1937 – Glyptotheque (Zagreb) founded.
- 1938
  - Mestrovic Pavilion and Sava Bridge built.
  - V Gymnasium established.
- 1939 – Archaeological Museum established.
- 1940 – Vjesnik newspaper begins publication.
- 1941
  - April: City designated capital of Independent State of Croatia.
  - September 14: Sabotage at the General Post Office.
- 1942 – University Hospital established.
- 1943 – 1943 Zagreb street execution
- 1944 – 1945 - Bombing by Allied forces.
- 1945 – Mladost sports society is founded.
- 1946 – KK Cibona is founded (as Sloboda).
- 1952 – Peasant Art Gallery founded.
- 1953
  - Privredni vjesnik business newspaper begins publication.
  - Population: 350,452.
- 1954
  - Technical Museum and City Gallery of Contemporary Art founded.
  - Gavella Drama Theatre opens.
- 1958
  - City government relocates to Stjepan Radic Square.
  - 1 Ilica Street and Jankomir Bridge built.
- 1959
  - Liberty Bridge opens.
  - Večernji list newspaper begins publication.
  - 1 Ilica Street skyscraper is completed.
- 1961 – Music Biennale Zagreb begins.
- 1962
  - Zagreb Airport begins operating.
  - Glas Koncila Catholic newspaper begins publication.
- 1964
  - 1964 Zagreb flood, the biggest flooding disaster in the city's history.
  - Presidential Palace built.
  - XV Gymnasium founded.
- 1967 – Golden Spin of Zagreb ice skating competition begins.
- 1972
  - Animafest Zagreb begins.
  - Dom Sportova built.
- 1973
  - Vatroslav Lisinski Concert Hall opens.
  - Zagreb TV Tower built.
- 1974
  - August 30: Train disaster.
  - Mamutica residential apartment complex and Youth Bridge built.
- 1976
  - SFera science fiction society formed.
  - Zagrepčanka built.
- 1981
  - Adriatic Bridge opens.
  - Population: 649,586.
- 1982
  - Klovićevi dvori art gallery opens.
  - Podsused Bridge built.
- 1983 – SFeraKon science fiction convention begins.
- 1984 – Radio 101 begins broadcasting.
- 1987
  - City hosts Summer Universiade.
  - Mimara Museum opens.
  - Cibona Tower, Zagreb Mosque, and Cibona Sports Center built.
- 1988 – Clinical Hospital Dubrava founded.
- 1989 – Chromos Tower built.
- 1990
  - May 5: Eurovision Song Contest 1990
  - May 13: Dinamo Zagreb–Red Star Belgrade riot.
  - The Constitution of Croatia designates Zagreb as the capital of the Republic of Croatia.
  - Slobodni tjednik newspaper begins publication.
  - Globus, the most influential political weekly during the Independence war begins publication at the end of December.
- 1991
  - Zagreb Stock Exchange formed.
  - October 4: Bombing of Zagreb TV Tower.
  - October 7: Bombing of Banski dvori.
  - December 7: Murder of the Zec family
- 1995
  - Zagreb crisis begins.
  - May – Rocket attacks by Serbian forces.
  - New building of the National and University Library is opened.
- 1996
  - Radio Student begins broadcasting.
  - November: Protest against Radio 101 closure.
  - Marina Matulović-Dropulić becomes the first female mayor of Zagreb.
- 1998 – Jutarnji list newspaper begins publication.
- 1999 – International Piano Competition Svetislav Stančić begins.
- 2000
  - Milan Bandić becomes mayor.
  - Amadeo Theatre and Music Company founded.
  - Stadion NŠC Stjepan Spajić built.

== 21st century ==
- 2001 – Political Science Research Center founded.
- 2002
  - Zagreb Pride march begins.
  - Vlasta Pavić becomes mayor.
  - Zagreb School of Economics and Management founded.
- 2003
  - Zagreb Film Festival begins.
  - Nedjeljni Jutarnji weekly newspaper begins publication.
- 2004
  - Poslovni dnevnik business newspaper begins publication.
  - Zagrebacka Televizija begins broadcasting.
  - HOTO Tower built.
- 2005
  - Milan Bandic becomes mayor again.
  - 24sata newspaper begins publication.
  - ZagrebDox film festival begins.
  - Serbian Orthodox Secondary School founded.
- 2006
  - INmusic festival begins.
  - Eurotower and Zagrebtower built.
- 2007
  - Homeland Bridge opens.
  - Zagreb Jewish Film Festival begins.
- 2008
  - Subversive Film Festival begins.
  - October 23: assassination of Ivo Pukanić.
  - Arena Zagreb built.
- 2009
  - Museum of Contemporary Art opens.
- 2010 – Museum of Broken Relationships established.
- 2011
  - Population: 790,017.
  - Lauba art gallery established.
- 2012
  - Sky Office Tower built.
- 2013
  - 2013 European Figure Skating Championships
- 2014
  - xCimos tower built
  - New building of the Academy of Music completed.
- 2015
  - Strojarska Business Center completed.
- 2016
  - Population: 802,338
- 2019
  - []
- 2020
  - A strong earthquake causes widespread damage and injuries.
  - []

== See also ==
- History of Zagreb
- List of mayors of Zagreb
- Timeline of Croatian history
- Timelines of other cities in Croatia: Rijeka, Split

== Bibliography ==
- "Agram" . Encyclopædia Britannica. Vol. 1 (11th ed.). 1911. p. 382.
- F. K. Hutchinson (1909), "Agram", Motoring in the Balkans, Chicago: McClurg & Co., OCLC 8647011
- Tony Fabijančić (2003), "Zagreb", Croatia, Edmonton: University of Alberta Press, ISBN 0888643977
- Bilić, Josip; Ivanković, Hrvoje, eds. (2006). "Zagrebački leksikon". Zagrebački leksikon (in Croatian). Zagreb: Miroslav Krleža Institute of Lexicography and Masmedia. ISBN 953-157-486-3.
