= History of Zagreb =

The history of Zagreb, the capital and largest city of Croatia, dates back to the Middle Ages. The Romans had built a settlement, Andautonia, in present-day Ščitarjevo. The name "Zagreb" was first used in 1094 at the founding of the Zagreb diocese in Kaptol, after the Slavs had arrived in the area. Zagreb became a free royal city in 1242. It was made the capital of Croatia in 1845 and elected its first mayor, Janko Kamauf, in 1851. According to the 2011 Croatian census, Zagreb had 792,875 inhabitants and was also Croatia's largest city by area.

== Prehistory ==
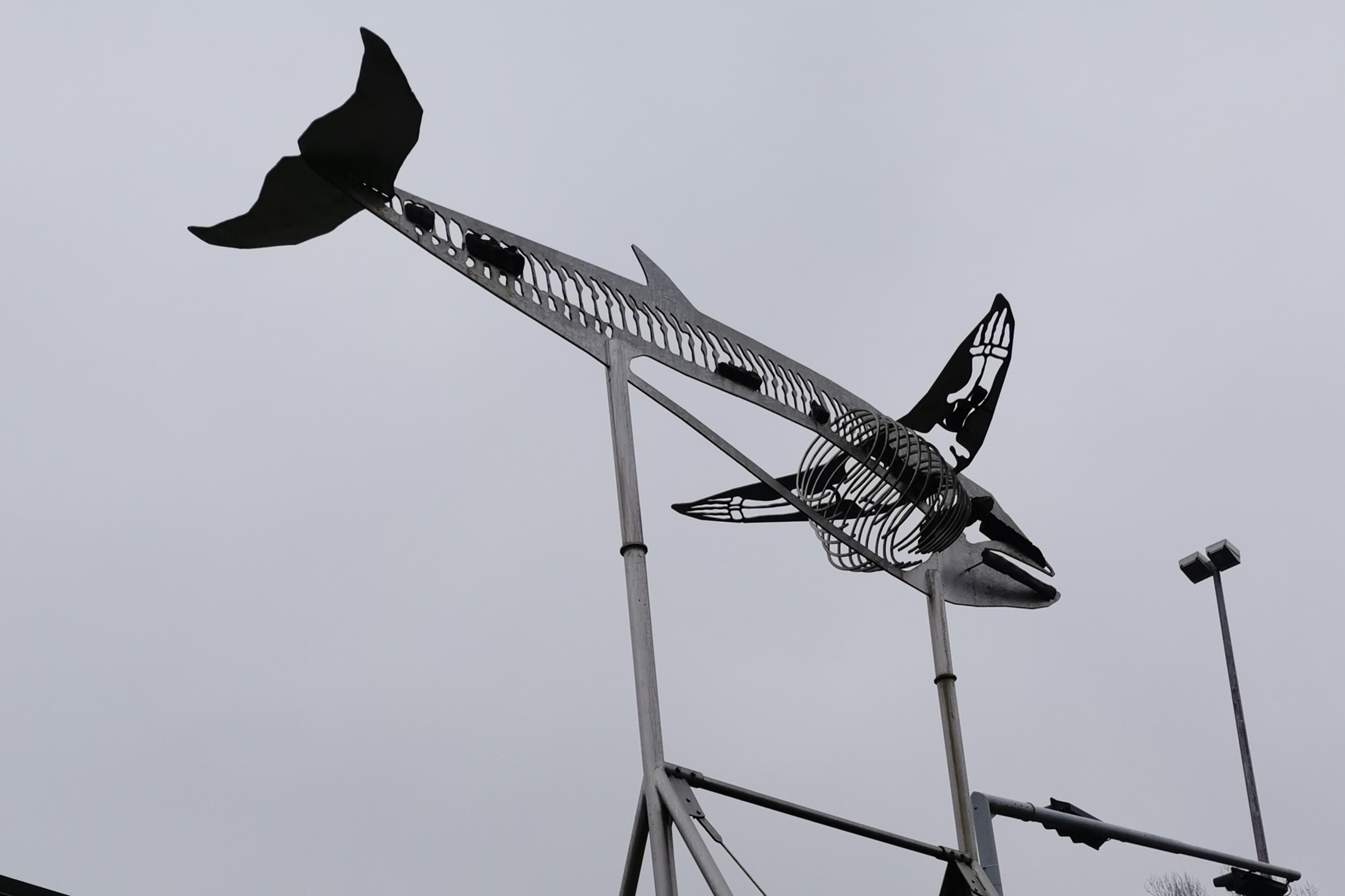
As area of Zagreb was once covered by Pannonian Sea, in Podsused, the westernmost neighbourhood of Zagreb, the remains of prehistoric whale were uncovered in the second half of the 19th century. Since this particular species was then unknown, it was named after Zagreb - Mesocetus agrami. The picture show whale's monument in Podsused.

Earliest evidence of humans in Zagreb and the surrounding region belongs to the Mousterian culture of Middle Palaeolithic. The Krapina Neanderthal site, the largest known sample of Neanderthal remains dating back to 125,000 years ago, is located 40 km (25 mi) north of the city. The 2,622-metre-long (8,602 ft) Veternica cave in the suburbs of Zagreb was explored in the early 20th century. Remains of Mousterian Neanderthals dated to 50,000–100,000 years ago were found there, as well as Roman-era and mediaeval human remains, and over 120 cave bear skulls, some of which appear to have been collected for ritual purposes. Extant Palaeolithic finds are largely located on the Medvednica mountain.

The first permanent settlements in what is today Zagreb were likely created by the Urnfield culture. People of the Urnfield culture were living in Zagreb by 1300 BCE and were affected by the migrations of the Bronze Age collapse. In 12th or 11th century BCE they built a likely fortified settlement at the location of modern-day Priest's Tower (Popov toranj) and Demeter Street.

== Old Zagreb ==
The term "Old Zagreb" was popularized by Gjuro Szabo, an admirer of Zagreb antiquities who advocated their conservation. Old Zagreb consisted of two settlements on neighboring hills - Gradec (also known as Gornji Grad) and Kaptol - and the houses in the valley between them along the former Medveščak creek (present-day Tkalčićeva Street). It includes settlements at the beginning of Vlaška Street III, beneath the diocesan (later archdiocesan) seat.

=== Kaptol ===
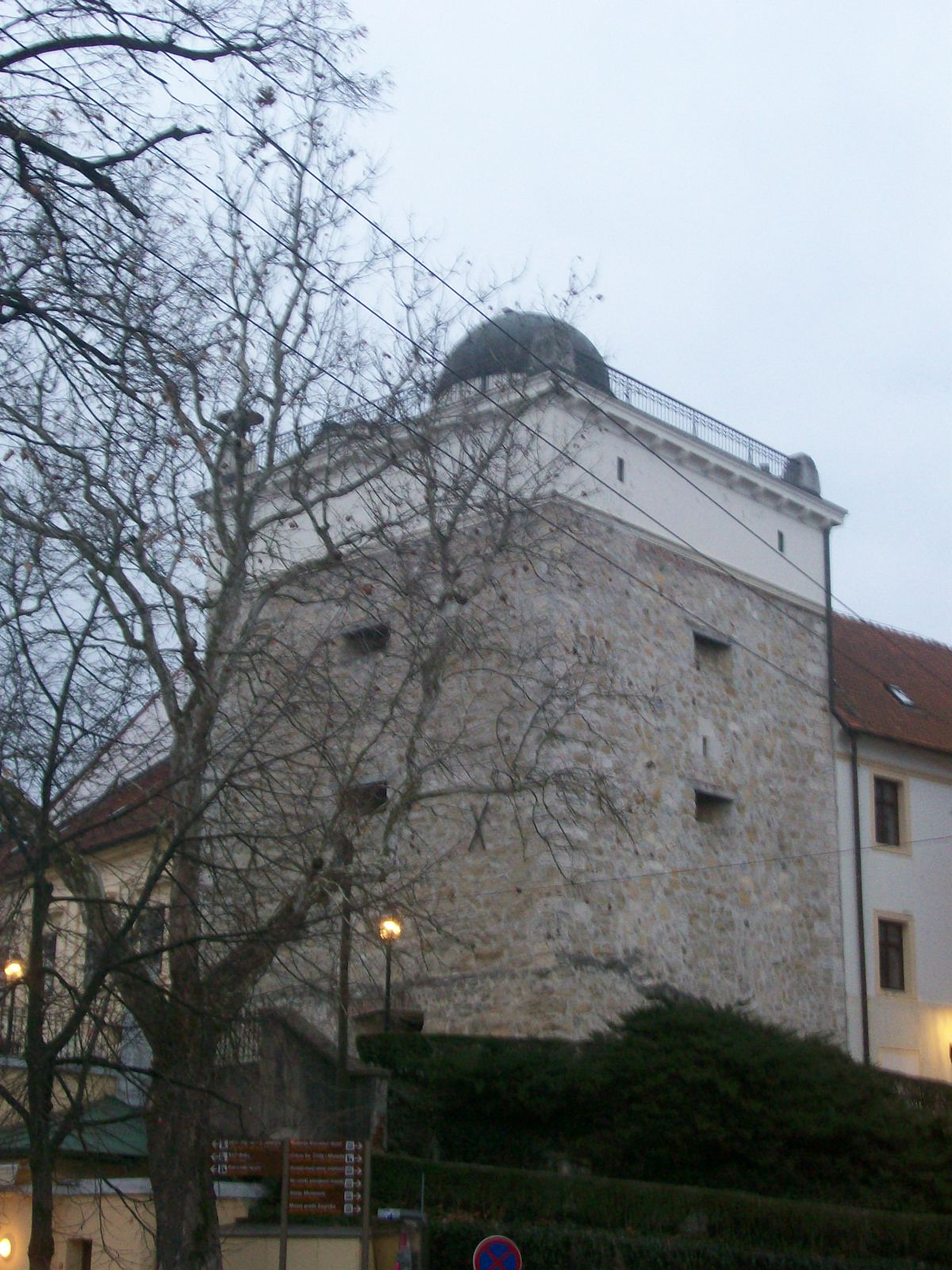
One of contested places in skirmishes between medieval Gradec and Kaptol was "Popov toranj" (Priest's Tower), where modern Zagreb Observatory is located.

The foundation of Kaptol (on the eastern slope) is traditionally dated in 1094, when Ladislaus I of Hungary founded the Zagreb diocese during the War of Croatian Succession. The Kaptol settlement was an asymmetric rectangle, with Bakačeva Street on the south and the present-day Kaptol School on the north. Kaptol derives its name from capitulum, the Latin word for the group of Canons Regular who ruled the settlement. Kaptol Street ran north–south across the Kaptol terrace, with the canons' residences in rows along it.

The bishop's residence and the cathedral were in the southeastern portion of the Kaptol hill. Vlaška Ves, near the cathedral, was first mentioned in 1198. In 1334, the canons of Zagreb established a colony of serfs near their residences north of Kaptol. This was the beginning of a settlement along the present-day Nova Ves street. The cathedral was consecrated in 1217, and restored and rebuilt in 1263 after it was damaged in Mongol invasion of 1242. That century, two Gothic churches were also built in Kaptol: St. Francis, with its Franciscan monastery, and St. Maria's.

Kaptol originally had no major fortifications; it was enclosed with a palisade, which was repeatedly destroyed and rebuilt. Its defensive walls and towers were built between 1469 and 1473. Prislin Tower, near the Kaptol School, is one of the best-preserved fortifications of the era.

During Hundred Years' Croatian-Ottoman War, in preparation for a possible Turkish attack, the bishop of Zagreb had fortifications built around the cathedral and his residence. The defensive towers and walls built between 1512 and 1520 still stand today, except those facing the front of the cathedral in Kaptol Square (which were demolished in 1907). In the neighborhood of Opatovina small houses still stand, but in the neighborhood of Dolac a number of small, narrow streets were demolished in 1926 when construction began on the Dolac Market.

=== Gradec ===
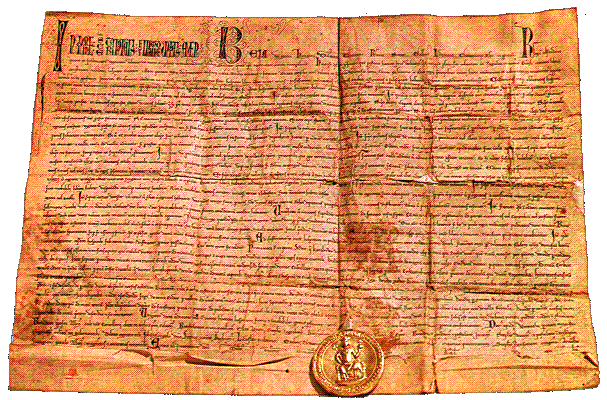
The Golden Bull of 1242, issued by king Bela IV in the aftermath of Mongol invasion, granted Gradec a status of "royal free cIty".

The other part of Old Zagreb is Gradec, on hill Grič. It was given a royal charter by Béla IV of Hungary in 1242. The Golden Bull of 1242 proclaimed a free royal city on Gradec, the hill of Zagreb, and made Gradec a feudal holding responsible directly to the king. Its citizens received a number of rights, including the election of their city judge and self-government. They built defensive walls and towers around their settlement, in anticipation of a new Tatar invasion, between 1242 and 1261. These walls are still visible in Gornji Grad.

The defensive walls enclosed the settlement in the shape of a triangle, with its apex near the Popov Toranj tower and its base at the south end (the Strossmayer Promenade). Rectangular and semicircular towers fortified the walls. Four main gates led into the city: the Mesnička Gate in the west, the Opatička Gate in the north, Dverce in the south and the Stone Gate in the east. The Stone Gate is the only one still extant. The keys to three gates (Stone Gate, smaller Poljska Gate (by the Lotrščak tower) and Mesnička Gate) were handed over to the mayor and city judge when they took office have been preserved. In 2012, Mayor Milan Bandić appointed the Zagreb majorettes as keepers of the city keys and handed them replicas of the keys while the originals are stored in the Zagreb City Museum.

The focal point of Gornji Grad is St. Mark's Square, with St. Mark's (Old Zagreb's parish church) in the middle. When guilds developed from the 15th to the 17th centuries as societies of craftsmen, their members (masters, journeymen and apprentices) gathered regularly at St. Mark's. On the church's northwest exterior wall is the oldest coat of arms of Zagreb with the year 1499 engraved on it; the original is in the Zagreb City Museum.

At the corner of St. Mark's Square and present-day Ćirilometodska Street is Old City Hall. The building, which has been altered and reconstructed several times, still hosts meetings of the Zagreb City Council. On the opposite side of the square, at the corner of Basaričekova Street, is St. Mark's parish office. The 16th-century house underwent reconstruction during the 18th century and the addition of an extension in the 19th century. At the west end of St. Mark's Square is the early-19th-century, Baroque-style Banski dvori, the former residence of the ban (viceroy) of Croatia, still used by the government of Croatia. Since 1734, the Croatian Parliament has met on the east side of St. Mark's Square.

Little is known about the medieval appearance of Vlaška Street. The name of the settlement was Vlaška Ves, or Vicus Latinorum in Latin. In the old part of present-day Vlaška Street, below the archbishop's residence and gardens, is a row of houses built from the end of the 18th to the beginning of the 19th centuries along the old road.

Medieval documents mention watermills and public baths along Medveščak Stream, in the valley between Gradec and Kaptol. Road construction in the area began during the 18th century and the first half of the 19th. The east bank of the stream was part of Kaptol, and its west bank part of Gradec.

== Kaptol and Gradec rivalry ==
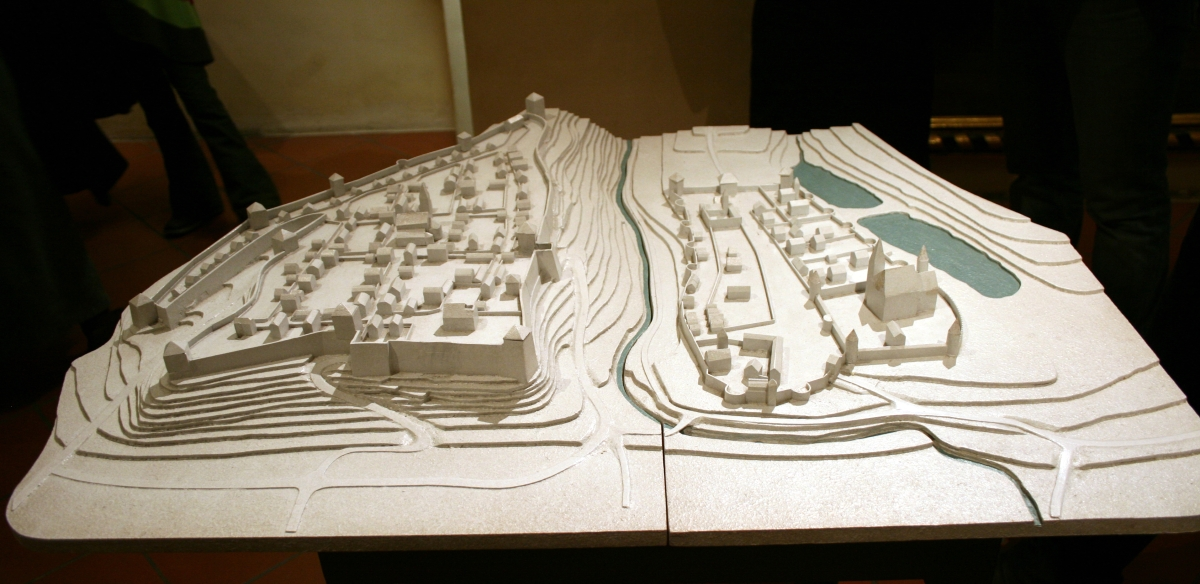
The model of Gradec (left) and Kaptol (right) in Zagreb Museum. Medveščak stream can be seen between two neighbouring hills, on the location of modern day Tkalčićeva Street.

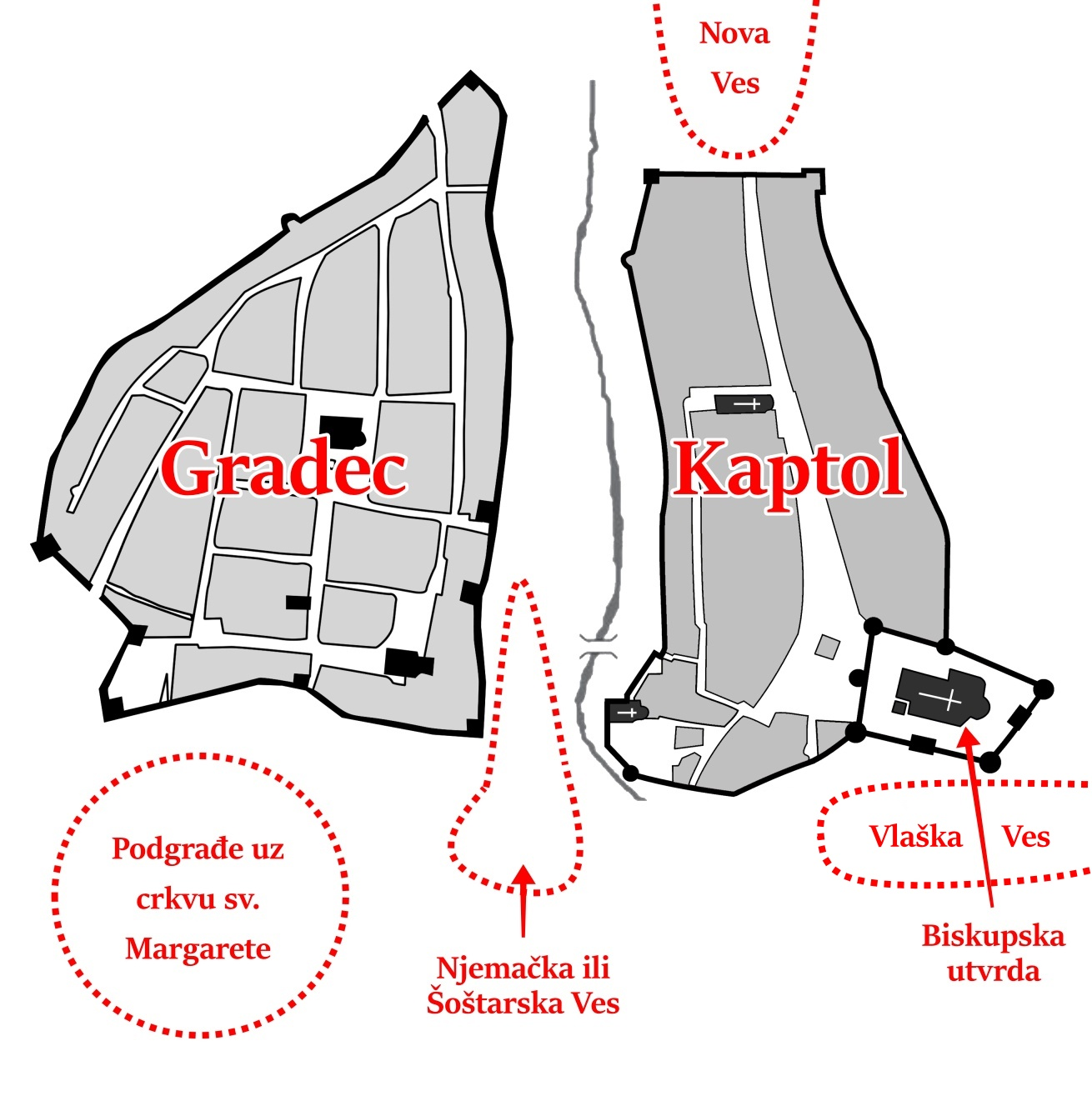
Gradec and Kaptol map, with Nova Ves and Vlaška Ves also indicated

The development of Kaptol began in 1094 after the foundation of the diocese, while the growth of Gradec began after the Golden Bull was issued in 1242.

In the history of the city of Zagreb, there have been numerous conflicts between Gradec and Kaptol. The imperfect medieval legal system led to strifes, legal disputes and violent conflicts between two neighbouring hills, as Kaptol meddled into economic life of Gradec. For one, Kaptol aimed to collect rents (mitnica and placovina) on entire territory of Zagreb, including Gradec, as kings granted them these rights. On the other hand, from perspective of Gradec, this violated the royal privileges granted to them by 1242 Golden Bull. Such situation led to centuries of skirmishes and bitter rivalry. During the periods of turmoils in the country, the two hills also tended to align with the opposing sides.

The first known conflict between Kaptol and Gradec broke out in the middle of the 14th century and continued in 1375. According to Nada Klaić, Kaptolites first set fire to a row of houses in Gradec suburb and then attacked Gradec women carrying merchandise to a local fair. On the same day, Kaptol servants attacked Nova Ves na Savi, where they allegedly raped women and killed some rich serf in his own house. They also captured one Gradec citizen and held him shackled until he bribed his way out. When Gradec citizens complained to official Kaptol about this behaviour, they received the response that: "they should be happy their town wasn't burn't down completely" and that they can expect it in the future too. Soon, Kaptol people attempted to burn Gradec again. When a merchant named Ivan spotted the fire and attempted to warn the others Kaptolites killed him and stole his merchandise. According to Nada Klaić, the reason for all this was an ongoing legal dispute. Gradec municipality complained to: county prefect, ban and even king himself, but to no avail. The conflict continued during the Anti-court struggles civil war, as Gradec aligned with two queens faction while Kaptol aligned with anti-court faction. The conflict reach its peak at the end of the 14th century when Gradec citizens were allowed to kill anyone who would attack them without legal consequences and couldn't leave the town walls without risking being attacked. The Kaptol bishop used his possession of Popov toranj to fire from bombards on Gradec, at Christmas Eve 1391. The two sides concluded short lasting peace in 1392.

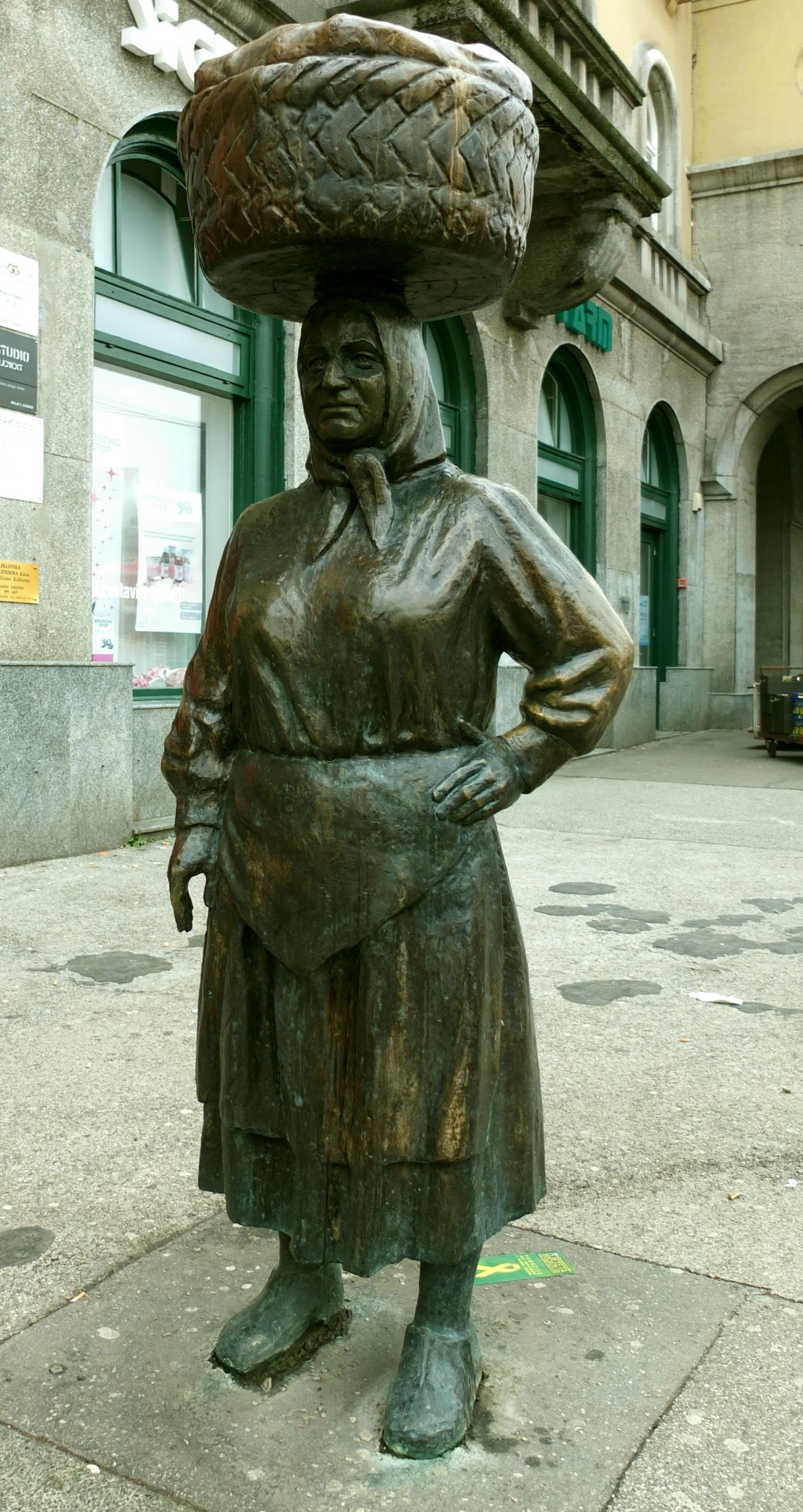
Late 15th century historical records mention: "women bringing goods on their heads" to Zagreb markets.

The new conflict broke out in 1396 and two sides clashed again. After a period of bloody and bitter fighting there were several massacres of the citizens, destruction of houses and looting. The bishop excommunicated Gradec in pompous ceremony in January 1397. On New Year's Eve, residents of Kaptol even dug out the graves of citizens of Gradec who were buried after excommunication and desecrated their remains. Gradec citizens ignored bishop's curse and again complained to the king Sigismund, who eventually forced bishop to lift his excommunication in St. Mark's Church. The king also absolved Gradec citizens from any kind of crime against Kaptol.

New conflicts, nonetheless continued in the 15th century, in 1421, because of the border line on Medveščak. These conflicts calmed down in 1469.

The great conflict between Kaptol and Gradec is mentioned in 1667 due to the construction of a bridge over the Medveščak stream.

In 1850, Gradec and Kaptol, with surrounding settlements, were united into a single settlement, today's city of Zagreb.

== 16th century ==
During the 16th century, Zagreb suffered permanent threat of Ottoman attacks. On top of the instabilities brought by the Ottoman conquests, the old rivalries between Gradec and Kaptol continued. CItizens of Gradec contributed to Hungarian troops in 1526 Battle of Mohacs by sending 40 well armed infantrymen and six horses used for towing cannons. The defeat at Mohacs and subsequent civil war again brought Gradec and Kaptol to the opposite sides in the conflict. While citizens of Gradec supported Ferdinand Habsburg, Kaptol, led by Zagreb bishop Šimun Erdody fiercely supported John Zapolya. These kind of circumstances led to new round of conflicts between Gradec and Kaptol.

Except for threat posed by the Ottomans, citizens of Gradec also suffered from violence conducted by Spanish, German and even Croatian ban Ivan Karlović's armies who harassed citizens, looted them, broke into their homes or harassed city guards. This kind of behaviour led to numerous complaints and requests sent to the king to relocate these armies elsewhere.

On assembly session held on 7 March 1577, Zagreb was for the first time called the capital city of Croatia-Slavonia.

== 17th century ==
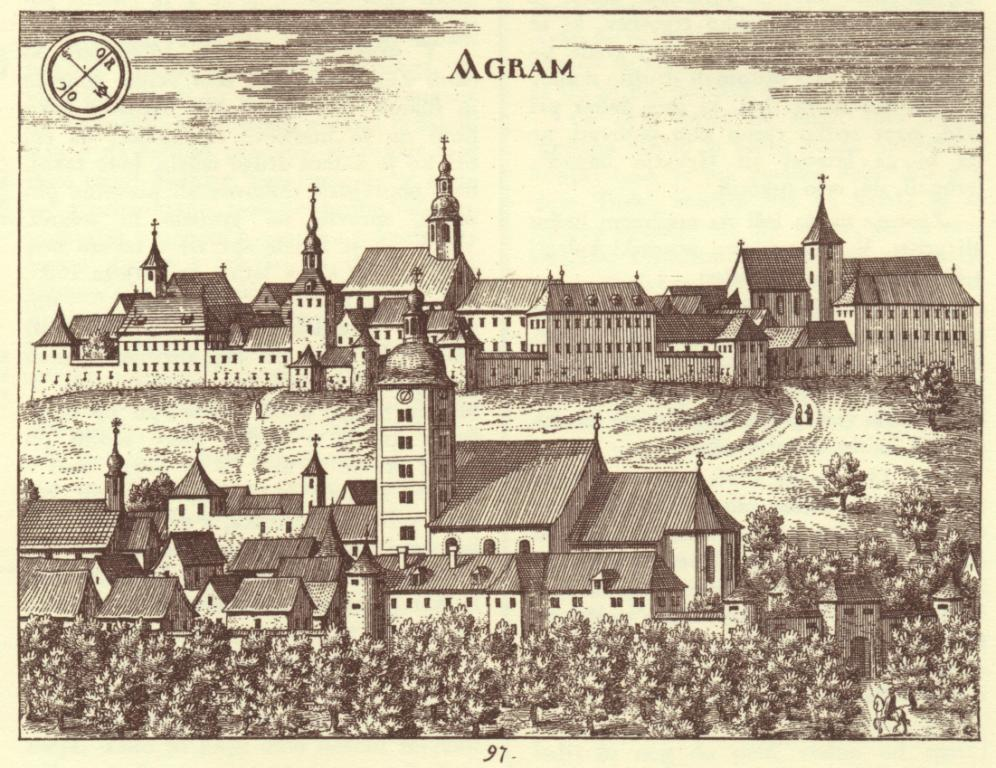
Zagreb in the late 17th century, by Johann Weikhard von Valvasor.

The century brought new construction to Old Zagreb, and many buildings were restored or rebuilt. During the first half of the century, three Roman Catholic orders arrived in the Upper Town. In 1606, the Jesuits brought Baroque architecture to Zagreb and settled in the city's southeastern corner. They built the first grammar school in Zagreb in St. Catherine's Square, St. Catherine's Church, and their monastery in Jesuit Square. St. Catherine's Church, built between 1620 and 1632, was the earliest sacred Baroque building in Zagreb.

The building and decoration of the church interior were incentives for local carpenters, sculptors, painters and gilders who were developing their own Baroque style. The Jesuit college, more modest than St. Catherine's Church, has been redeveloped as a museum.

The second order to arrive in Gradec were the Capuchins in 1618, who settled the southwestern part of Zagreb. They restored the old St. Mary's Church, built a monastery nearby (in present-day Vraničani Street) and cultivated a garden in the present-day park and playgrounds. Nothing remains of the Capuchin buildings, since they were demolished at the beginning of the 19th century. Nuns from the Poor Clares (about 1650) developed the northern part of the town near the medieval Popov toranj tower. One wing of their convent flanked the fortification wall and tower. Their church was demolished in the first half of the 19th century, and the convent now houses the Zagreb City Museum.

The south belfry of the Zagreb Cathedral in Kaptol was built after a 1645 fire, and Baroque styling was introduced in the interiors of the cathedral and St. Mary's and St. Francis' Churches. A number of Baroque residences were also built.

In addition to new elements introduced to the old city, it was realized that the relatively-small squares around St. Mark's Church and in front of the cathedral were unsuitable for large fairs. To promote trade and manufacturing, it was necessary to leave the walls on the hills. In 1641, the town authorities converted the gardens on the plain below Gradec and Kaptol into a marketplace which became Ban Jelačić Square. The area was chosen for its proximity to the Old Town and a spring. The name of the spring was Manduševac, and the square was named after the spring. It later became Harmica, and then Ban Jelačić Square.

The new marketplace and fairgrounds became places to conduct business, encouraging the authorities to develop the outskirts of the city and build access roads. During the 18th century, a number of houses were built on the northern and eastern sides of Manduševac and where Manduševac turned into Ilica Street. Long Street (Duga Ulica, or present-day Radićeva Street), linking Manduševac and the Upper City, gradually became the busiest shopping street in Zagreb. The market place and fairgrounds at Manduševac attracted people from south of the city and, by the middle of the 18th century, saw the beginnings of present-day Petrinjska Street. Small houses sprang up at its north end, which adjoined the market and fairgrounds.

The street's name, "Med grabami" (among the ditches), was indicative of its appearance and surroundings. However, the road linked the business center of Old Zagreb with the settlements on the north banks of the Sava. A ferry or pontoon bridge linked Zagreb and the area across the river, which was important to supply the Military Frontier. Petrinjska Street was named for Petrinja, the frontier's centre.

In July 1651, Zagreb was severely flooded after an evening thunderstorm. The Medveščak overflowed its banks and destroyed all the houses in Tkalčićeva Street, killing 52 people. During the century, peasants (the urban serfs of nearby villages) are increasingly mentioned in city records. The settlements of Gračani, Dedići (near Šestine) and Črnomerec were mentioned as early as the 13th and 14th centuries. At the beginning of the 17th century, when Turkish raids across the Sava were no longer a threat, city authorities established serfs' villages in the vicinity. The thirteen villages were in the Sava valley and on the slopes of Medvednica. Gračani, Gornje and Donje Prekrižje, Jelenovec, Vrhovci, Čukovici, and Domjanići were on the mountain, and on the plain near the river were Trnje, Ilijašići, Bankoviti and Govenka (which no longer exists), Horvati and Črnomerec. Across the Sava were the villages of Pobrežje and Otok. The largest urban village was Trnje, and its inhabitants used the Med grabami road to reach Zagreb. The villages were under the jurisdiction of the magistrate at City Hall in St. Mark's Square, and their parish church was St. Mark's. This urban area, stretching from Medvednica to the Sava, appears on a large-scale map drawn by surveyor Leopold Kneidinger in 1766 which is in the Zagreb City Museum.

== Modern Zagreb ==
Although much documentation of Old Zagreb and the 19th-century development of Donji grad (downtown Zagreb) exists, there has been little research into early-20th-century building in the city. The century began with Art Nouveau construction in Donji grad from 1899 until World War I. Examples include the Ethnographical Museum (14 Mažuranić Square), the former sanatorium building (Children's Clinic) in Klaićeva Street and the National and University Library on Marulić Square. Modern architecture, led by Viktor Kovačić, is exemplified by St. Blaž Church at the corner of Deželić Drive and Primorska Street.

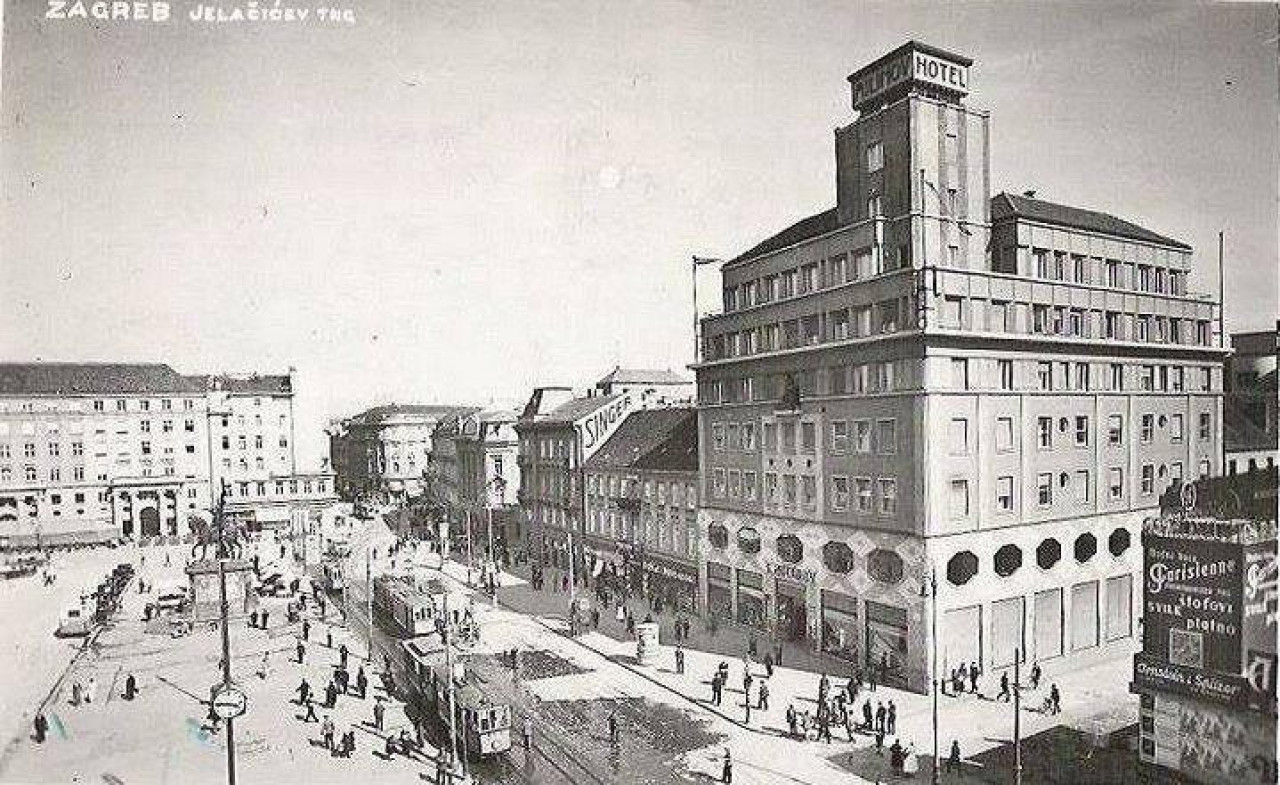
A building of Hotel Milinov (nowadays Hotel Dubrovnik) on ban Jelačić Square, as it was in 1936.

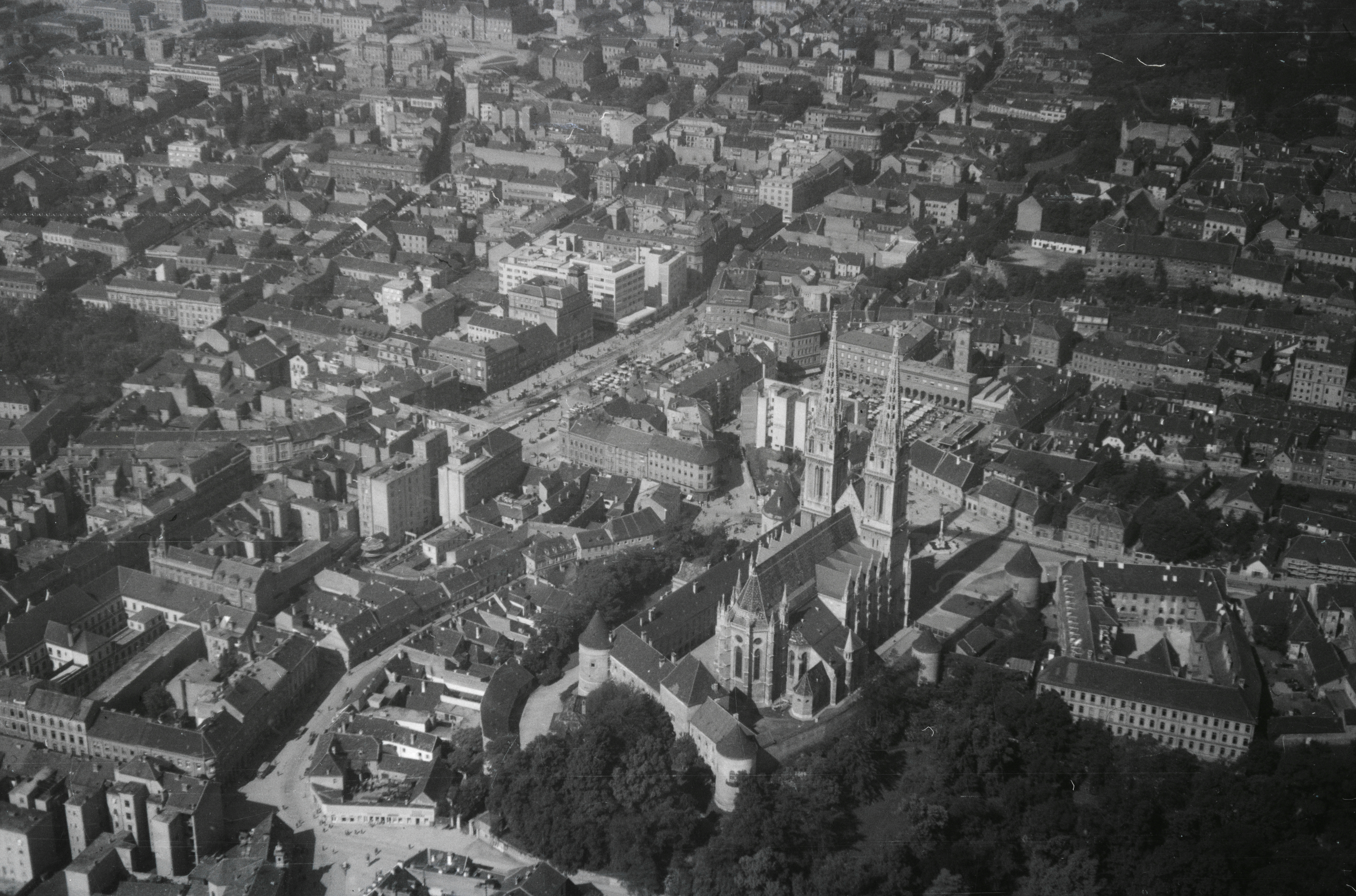
Aerial view of Kaptol and Zagreb Cathedral, between 1932 and 1936. Photo taken by Walter Mittelholzer

In 1902 the city boundary was moved east of Međašnji Square (today's Eugen Kvaternik Square), encompassing Stara Peščenica and Maksimir. Building was more intensive in the open space east of Palmotićeva Street. Zagrebacki Zbor, the forerunner of the Zagreb Fair, organised its shows and displays at the riding school in present-day Martićeva Street, and the Burza area was the fairgrounds. The interwar period saw the area's development, with Kovačić's 1925–1926 stock-exchange buildings at 3 Burza Square, Ivan Meštrović's round exhibition pavilion (the present Croatian History Museum) and the Đuro Salaj Hall. All were built around the same time as the three nearby squares (Burza, Great Croats and Peter Krešimir IV Squares) in accordance with the zoning plan for eastern Zagreb.

Functionalism, promoted by the Zagreb School of Architecture, appeared during the 1930s. Building flourished during the decade, since Zagreb was an industrial and business centre with a population of about 280,000 before World War II. Suburban development in Trešnjevka and Trnje was more haphazard.

The first railway line connecting Zagreb with Zidani and Sisak opened in 1862, and the following year a gasworks was built. The Zagreb waterworks opened in 1878, and its first horse-drawn tramcar was commissioned in 1891. The railways enabled the old suburbs to gradually merge into Donji Grad, characterized by the block pattern prevalent in Central European cities. In addition to buildings, the city's core has monuments, parks, museums, theaters and cinemas. An electric power plant was built in 1907. Zagreb developed from 1880 to 1914 after an earthquake, when the city adopted its present layout. Working-class housing increased between the railway and the Sava, and residential construction on the southern slope of Medvednica was completed between the two World Wars.

During the 1920s Zagreb's population increased by 70 percent, the city's largest demographic boom. In 1926 Zagreb introduced the region's first radio station, and in 1947 the Zagreb Fair was the first in the Federal People's Republic of Yugoslavia.

The area between the railway and the Sava saw considerable new construction after World War II. After the mid-1950s, construction of Novi Zagreb (New Zagreb), residential areas south of the Sava, began. The city expanded west and east, incorporating Dubrava, Sesvete, Podsused, Jarun, Blato and other settlements.

In 1964, Zagreb once again suffered from a disastrous flood, the 1964 Zagreb flood which killed 17 people and left 40,000 homeless.

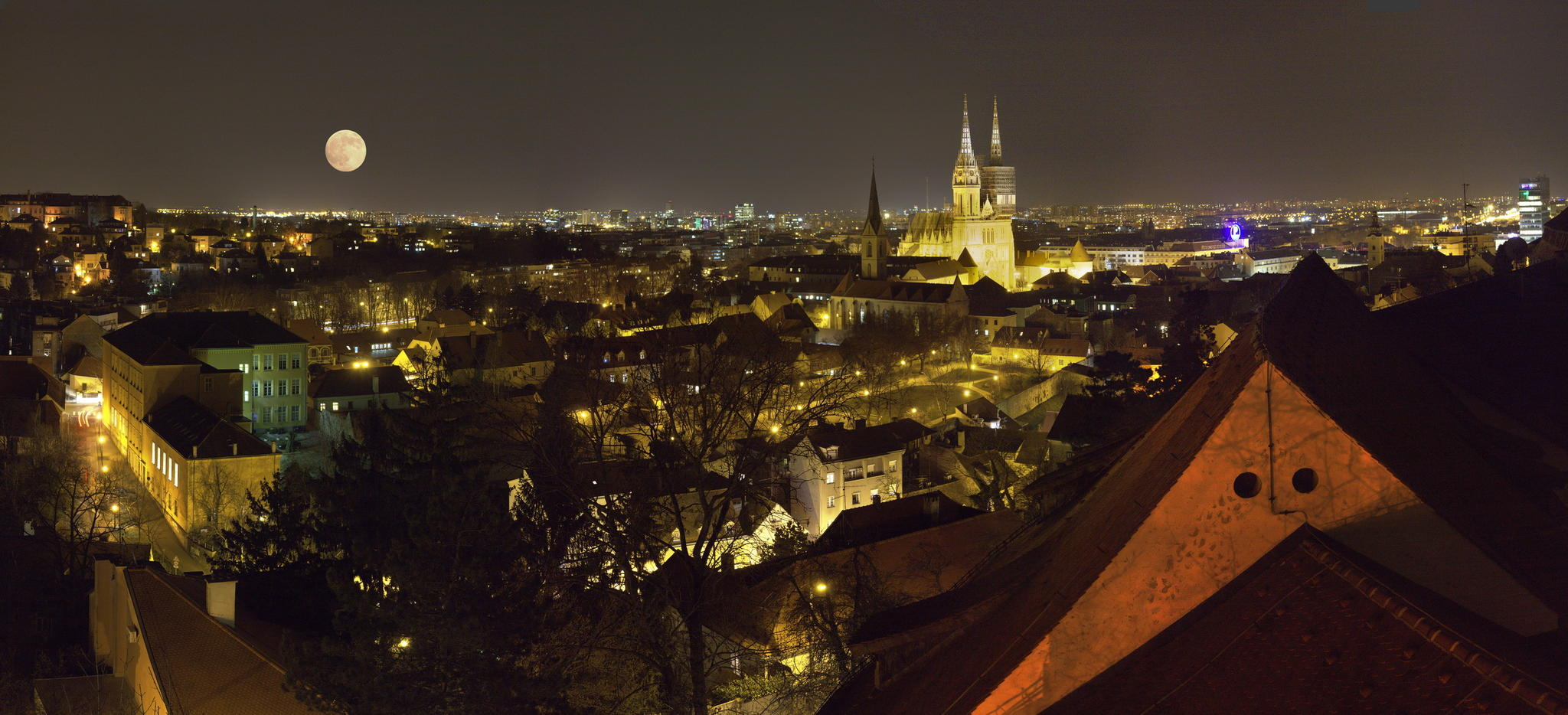
Zagreb at night.

The freight rail hub and Pleso Airport were built south of the Sava. The Žitnjak industrial zone in the southeast, the city's largest, is an extension of the industrial zones on the eastern outskirts of the city between the Sava and Prigorje. In 1987, Zagreb hosted the Summer Universiade.

Urbanized lines of settlements connect Zagreb with its surroundings: Sesvete, Zaprešić, Samobor, Dugo Selo and Velika Gorica. Sesvete, the nearest, is part of the City of Zagreb rather than Zagreb County (which excludes the city). It is part of the expanding urban area in the east as far as Dugo Selo.

On March 22, 2020, a strong earthquake hit Zagreb, causing significant damage to the historic downtown area. This was the strongest earthquake since the one in 1880.

In the early hours of Friday, 11th of March 2022, an unidentified aircraft crashed into the Jarun district near a student home, causing moderate property damage. The unknown aircraft was presumed to be a Tupolev Tu-141 which entered the country from the Hungary-Romania direction.

== See also ==
- Timeline of Zagreb
- Baltazar Adam Krčelić
- Ivan Tkalčić
- Gjuro Szabo
- History of Croatia
- Croatian National Theatre in Zagreb
- Mimara Museum
- Croatian Academy of Sciences and Arts
- Mirogoj Cemetery
- Zagreb train disaster
