= Gjuro Szabo =

Croatian historian (1875–1943)

- Born: February 3, 1875; Novska, Austria-Hungary
- Died: May 2, 1943 (aged 68); Zagreb, NDH
- Occupation: Historian

Gjuro Szabo (pronounced [dʑûro sâbo], sometimes also Đuro Szabo; February 3, 1875, in Novska – May 2, 1943, in Zagreb) was a Croatian historian, art conserver and museologist. He published over 200 papers about Croatian national history, the history of art, art conservation, museology and toponomastics, such as Medieval cities of Croatia and Slavonia, Through the Croatian Hinterland and Old Zagreb. From 1911 to 1943, he was the secretary of the State Committee for Landmark Preservation in Croatia and Slavonia, and from 1929 the manager of the Zagreb City Museum.

== Work ==
- Szabo, Gjuro (1920). Sredovječni gradovi u Hrvatskoj i Slavoniji [Medieval Castles in Croatia and Slavonia] (PDF) (in Croatian).
- "Contributions to the Building History of Zagreb Cathedral" (Prilozi za građevnu povijest zagrebačke katedrale), Zagreb, 1929
- "From the Olden Days of Zagreb" (Iz starih dana Zagreba), Zagreb, 1929 (vol. I), 1930 (vol. II), 1933 (vol. III)
- "The Art of Our Countryside Churches" (Umjetnost u našim ladanjskim crkvama), Zagreb, 1930
- "Through the Hrvatsko Zagorje (Croatian Hinterland)", (Kroz Hrvatsko zagorje), Zagreb, 1939
- "Old Zagreb", (Stari Zagreb), Zagreb, 1941
