= Janko Kamauf =

First mayor of Zagreb, Croatia

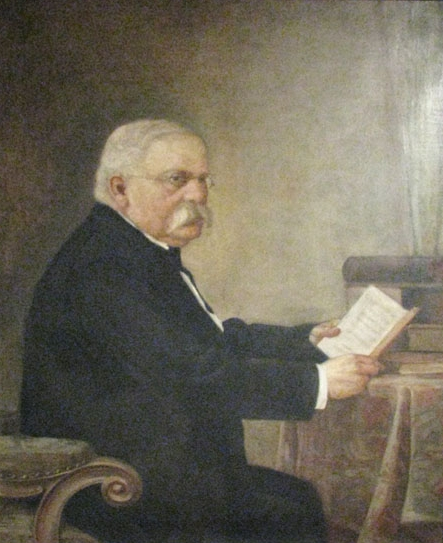
- Portrait of Janko Kamauf by Bela Čikoš Sesija on display at the Zagreb City Museum

Mayor of Zagreb
- In office 1851–1857
- Preceded by: Office created
- Succeeded by: Josip F. Haerdtl

Personal details
- Born: 10 December 1801 Gradec, Kingdom of Croatia, Habsburg monarchy
- Died: 11 August 1874 (aged 72) Zagreb, Croatia-Slavonia, Austria-Hungary

Janko Kamauf (1801–1874) was the last city magistrate of Gradec and the first mayor of Zagreb, the current capital of Croatia. He saw the unification of Gradec, Kaptol and several surrounding villages into Zagreb by ban Josip Jelačić in 1850 and remained the city mayor until 1857.

== See also ==
- List of mayors of Zagreb

Political offices
Preceded by Office created	Mayor of Zagreb; 1851–1857	Succeeded by Josip F. Haerdtl
