= Golden Bull of 1242 =

1242 edict proclaiming Gradec (Zagreb) a royal free city

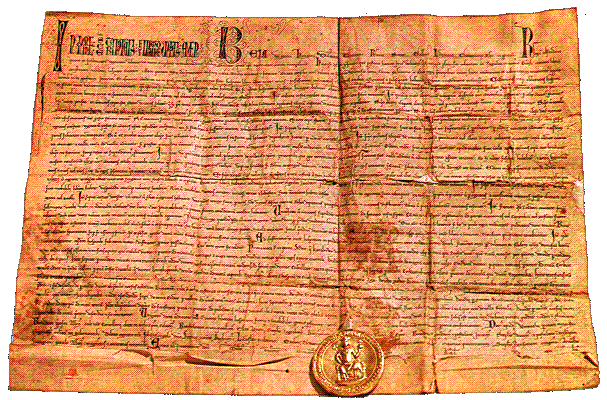
- Created: 16 November 1242
- Location: Zagreb State Archive
- Author: Béla IV
- Purpose: Proclaiming Gradec a royal free city

The Golden Bull of 1242 was a golden bull or edict, issued by King Béla IV of Hungary to the inhabitants of Gradec (part of today's Zagreb, the capital of Croatia) during the Mongol invasion of Europe. By this golden bull, King Béla IV proclaimed Gradec a royal free city. The document was issued on 16 November 1242 in Virovitica and reaffirmed in 1266. The original is written on a piece of parchment 57 by 46 centimetres (22 by 18 in) in size, and is kept in strictly controlled conditions in the Croatian State Archives in Zagreb, while a copy is exhibited in the Zagreb City Museum.

== Provisions ==
The Golden Bull declared and proclaimed "a free royal city on Gradec, the hill of Zagreb". The town was to be presided by a "city judge" (Croatian: gradski sudac, Latin: iudex), who was elected yearly by the citizenry and communities and fulfilled the role of the mayor. In addition, eight jurors (Latin: jurati) and twenty city councillors were elected each year on 3 February, the Feast of St. Blaise. Gradec remained ruled by the iudex until 1850, when Gradec, Kaptol and several other municipalities were formally unified into a new royal city of Zagreb.

The edict brought many benefits and freedoms to Gradec's inhabitants. Among others, it stated that the towns were subject directly to the King and royal servants and nobles whose estate they were situated on. This also brought it outside the jurisdiction of the Diocese of Zagreb, which collected revenue from large land holdings, and was headquartered on the neighbouring hill of Kaptol; during the Middle Ages, conflicts would often break out between the citizens of Gradec and canons of Kaptol, sometimes resulting in civil wars. Citizens also gained freedom of movement, free use of their property, and the freedom to freely draw up their own testament. In addition, they were absolved of paying road and bridge tolls in the Croatian-Hungarian Kingdom.

In return for the privileges gained, the citizens were required to erect fortifications around the town at their own expense, which they did in 1266. They were also required to supply the king with "12 oxen, 1000 loaves of bread and 4 barrels of wine" in case of a royal visit, and ten armed soldiers in case of war. The latter requirement was repealed by the king in 1266. The citizens also had to provide for a visit by the Duke of Slavonia or Ban of Croatia (only one visit for the Ban).

The bull also defined the borders of land controlled by Gradec—the city was entitled to land south of the ridge of the Medvednica mountain, west of Vrapčak stream and north of the Sava River.

== Motive ==
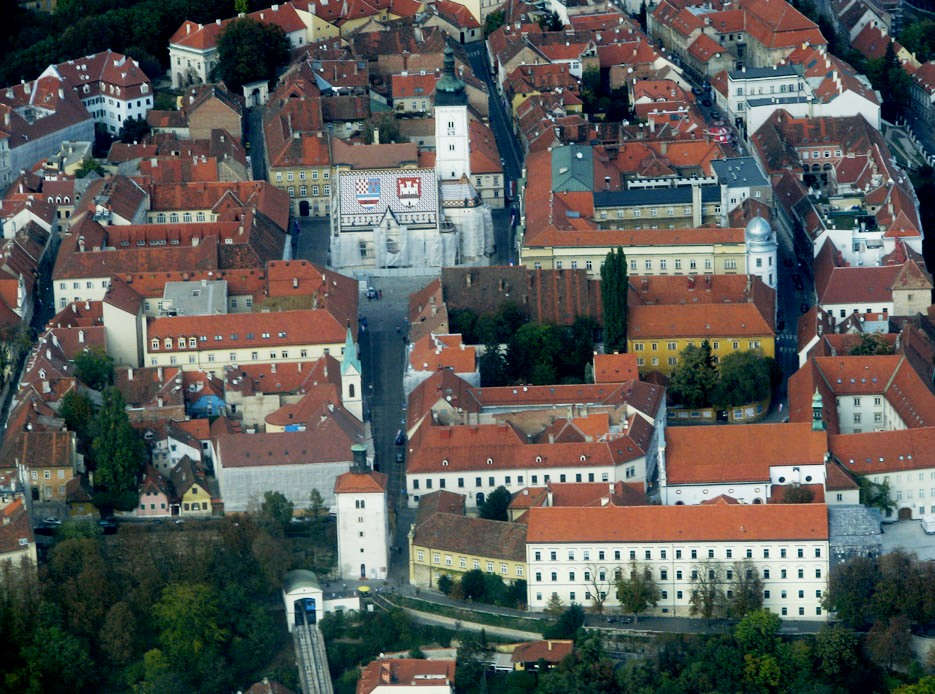
Gradec today

The Golden Bull of 1242 was only one in a series of proclamations of royal privileges to towns. In the years preceding the Golden Bull, Mongols had invaded Europe under Batu Khan's command. In early 1241 they reached Hungary, bringing defeat in April that year at the Battle of Mohi on the Sajó River. King Béla IV and the royal family hid from the Mongols in Zagreb. In the winter of 1241–42, Mongols crossed the frozen Drava and Danube rivers. The king fled to Dalmatia as Mongols approached the poorly fortified Zagreb, which they levelled and burnt to the ground. The recently consecrated Zagreb Cathedral was raided and severely damaged by the invading army. The Mongol army continued pursuing Béla until March, when the word of Great Khan Ögedei's death reached them, and they retreated to Central Asia. Following the cease of hostilities, and in anticipation of a new invasion, Béla IV issued dozens of privileges encouraging the building of fortified urban settlements, as these turned out to be the only viable holdouts during the war.

== Impact ==
Helped by its location at the intersection of two important trade routes, the new town of Gradec—protected by stone walls, unlike its neighbour Kaptol—reached a population of around 3,000 in the 14th century, which made it a sizable city in then largely rural Central Europe. It was also a financial centre of the Croatian-Hungarian Kingdom, as it held a silver mint, and was the base of the thirtieth tax collection in Slavonia, a major source of employment for the town. In 1267, the citizens of Gradec were absolved of paying the thirtieth. As a royal free city, Gradec was also allowed to hold daily and weekly tax-free fairs, as well as a fortnightly fair around the Feast of St. Mark (held from 17 April to 3 May), which was first held in 1256, on St. Mark's Square. The St. Mark's fair was revived at the turn of the 21st century, and continues in the present day.

In 1992, the city of Zagreb celebrated the 750th anniversary of the Golden Bull. An exhibition was held by the Zagreb City Museum and the Zagreb State Archive to commemorate this occasion.
