= Zagreb City Museum =

Museum in Zagreb, Croatia

- Мuzej grada Zagreba
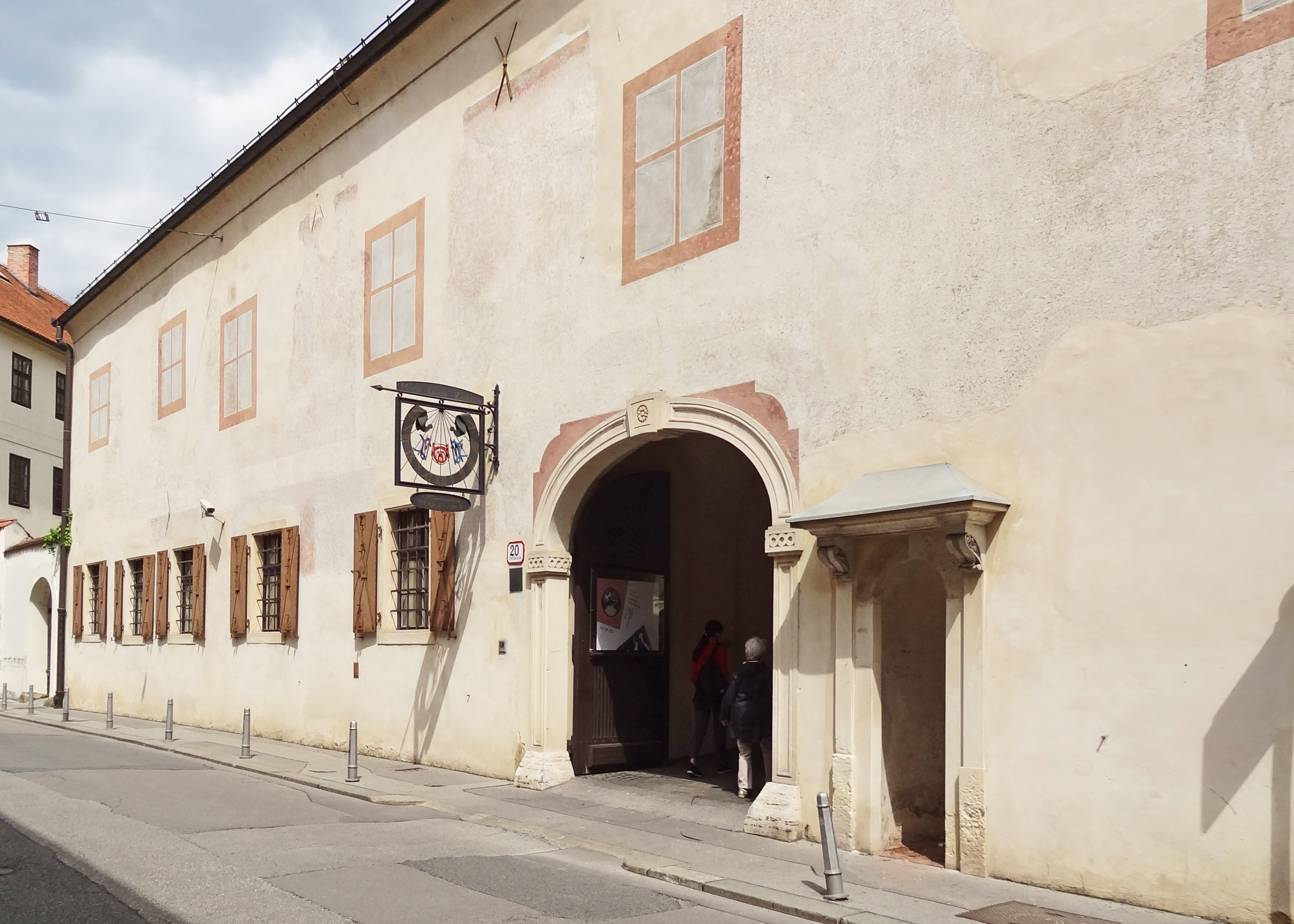
- Entrance of the Museum
- Established: 1907; 119 years ago
- Location: Zagreb, Croatia
- Coordinates: 45.8131°N 15.978°E
- Type: General, Cultural-Historical
- Accreditation: Zagreb
- Collection size: 4,500
- Visitors: 110,393 (2023)
- Founder: Brethren of the Croatian Dragon
- Director: dr. sc. Aleksandra Berberih Slana
- Curators: Lora Heršak, Iva Kranjec, Vesna Vukelić Horvatić, Juraj Sekula
- Public transit access: ZET Bus 150
- Parking: Yes
- Website: www.mgz.hr/en/visit-us/zagreb-city-museum/

Zagreb City Museum or Museum of the City of Zagreb (Croatian: Muzej grada Zagreba) located in 20 Opatička Street, was established in 1907 by the Association of the Brethren of the Croatian Dragon (Croatian: Braća hrvatskoga zmaja).

It is located in a restored monumental complex (12th-century Popov toranj, the Observatory, 17th-century Zakmardi Granary) of the former Convent of the Poor Clares, of 1650.

The Museum deals with topics from the cultural, artistic, economic and political history of the city spanning from the prehistory, Roman finds to the modern period. The holdings comprise 75,000 items arranged systematically in a combined chronological and thematic approach into collections of artistic and mundane objects characteristic of the city and its history. It consists of a number of paintings, maps, city views, furniture, flags, military uniforms and coats of arms.

== History ==
The museum was founded in 1907, making it one of the oldest cultural institutions in Zagreb. It was initially established as a way to collect, preserve, and showcase the city's history, including its architecture, artifacts, and historical documents. The museum has since grown to become a key player in the cultural and historical landscape of Zagreb.

The museum is housed in a building that itself holds historical significance. It is located in the old town of Zagreb, specifically in Kulmer Palace (Kulmerova palača), a late Baroque palace built in the 18th century. This location provides a fitting backdrop for the museum’s exhibits, as it is close to many other historical landmarks in Zagreb.

== Collections and Exhibits ==
The museum’s permanent collections cover a wide range of topics that trace Zagreb’s evolution from prehistoric times to the modern era. These collections are typically divided into various themes:

- Prehistory and Antiquity : The museum has a range of objects from prehistoric and ancient times, including tools and artifacts from early settlements in the area that would become Zagreb.
- Medieval Zagreb : The museum explores Zagreb’s medieval past, highlighting key moments in its development, including its role as a fortified town and its religious significance in the Middle Ages. The collection includes medieval manuscripts, religious artifacts, and depictions of medieval Zagreb.
- Early Modern Era : The museum traces Zagreb’s transformation during the Renaissance and Baroque periods, as well as its role in Croatian and European history. This includes paintings, maps, and documents from the time of the Habsburg monarchy.
- 19th Century Zagreb : This section focuses on Zagreb during the 1800s, a time of significant urban development, the rise of industry, and the growth of Zagreb as a cultural and political center. The museum features a rich array of objects from this period, including fashion, photography, and items reflecting the changing social conditions.
- 20th Century to Today : The museum also explores Zagreb in the 20th century, covering topics such as the two World Wars, Yugoslavia’s formation, and Zagreb’s transformation into the capital of an independent Croatia. This includes materials related to art, Industry, politics, film and everyday life during the 20th century. Zagreb City Museum holds the original Academy Award for Best Animated Feature for "The Surrogate", animated film by Dušan Vukotić from 1962.
- Temporary Exhibitions : The museum regularly hosts temporary exhibitions, which often focus on specific aspects of Zagreb’s history, contemporary issues, or special collections. These can range from exhibitions on famous local figures, to contemporary art, to deep dives into specific historical events.

== Gallery ==
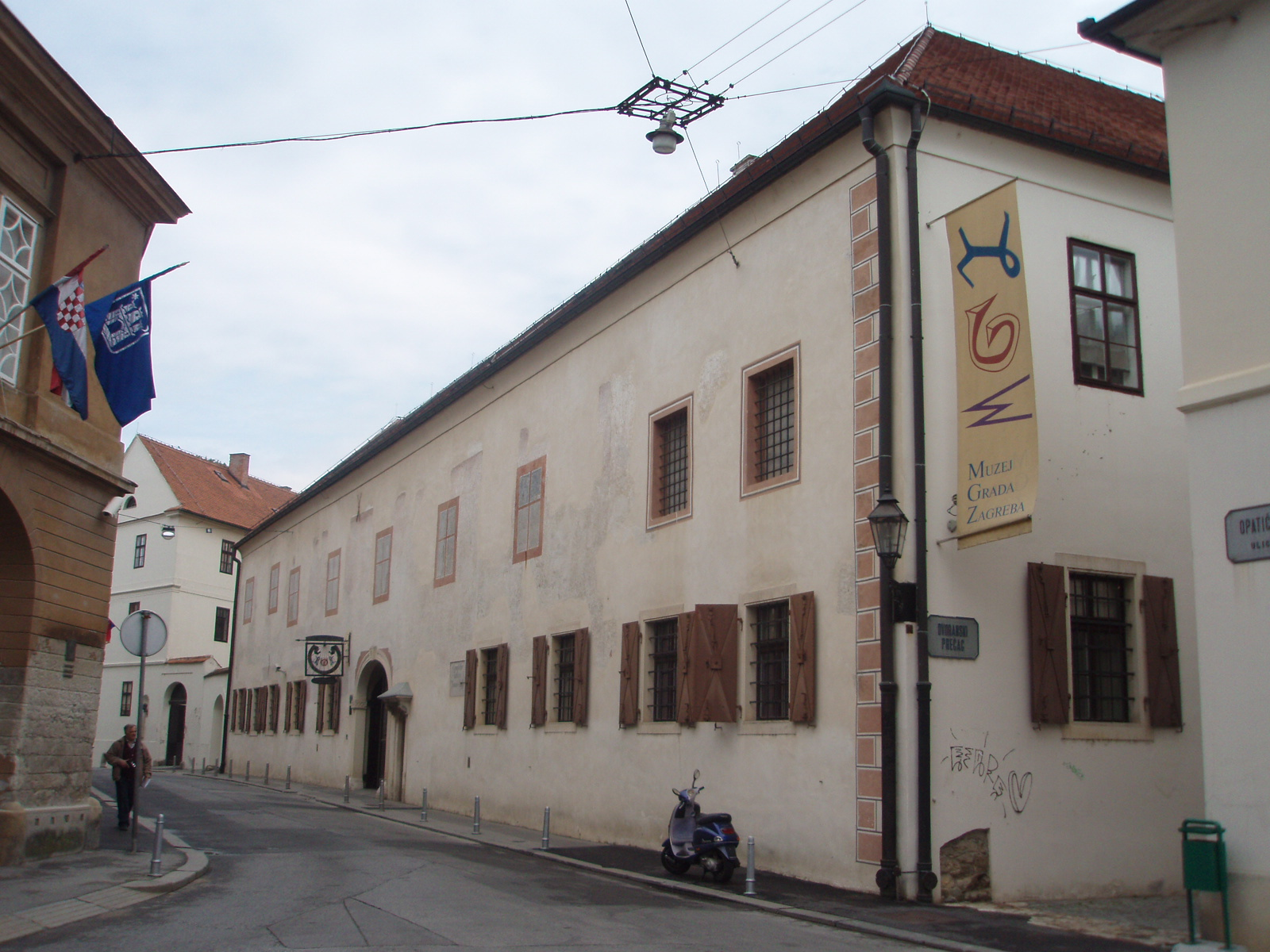
Zagreb City Museum

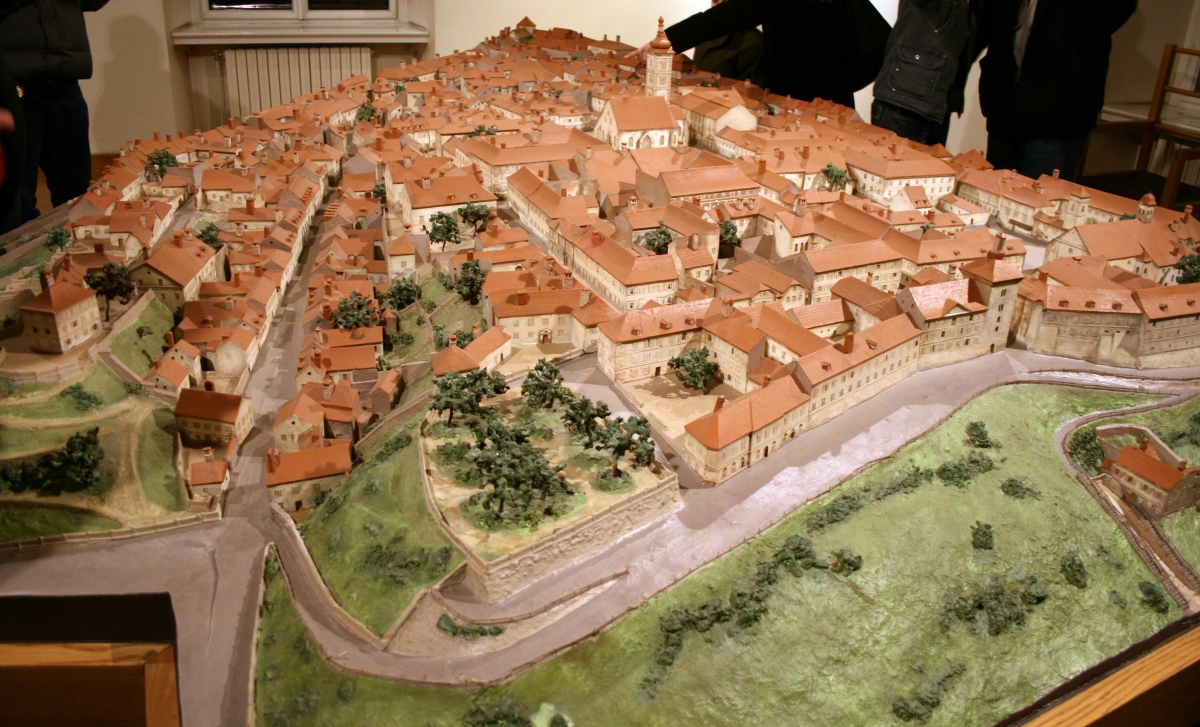
Zagreb model

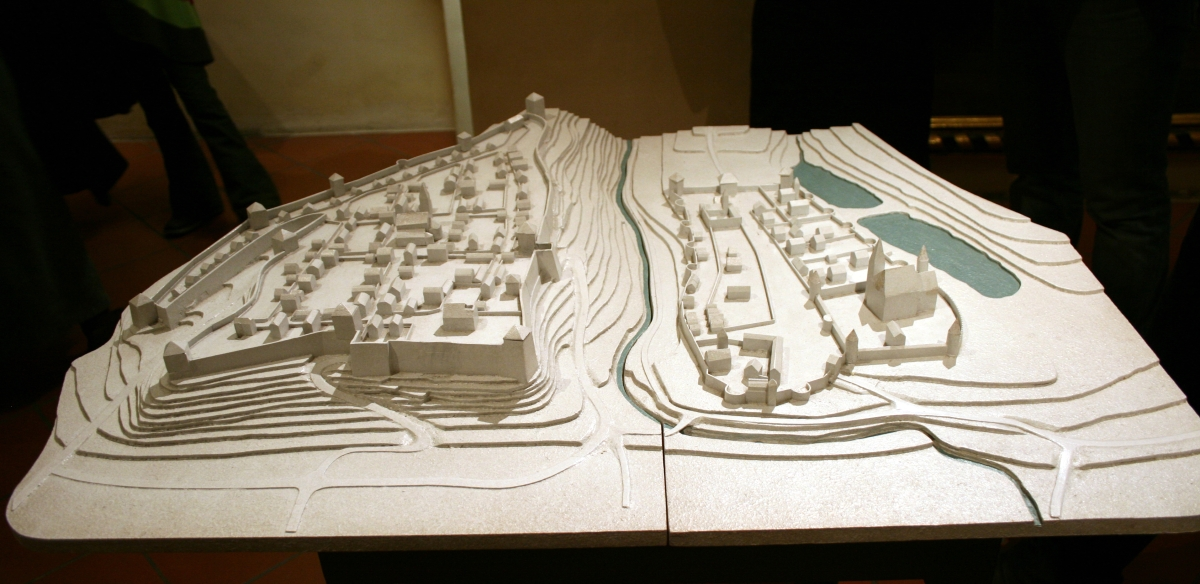
Model of Gradec and Kaptol from 13th century

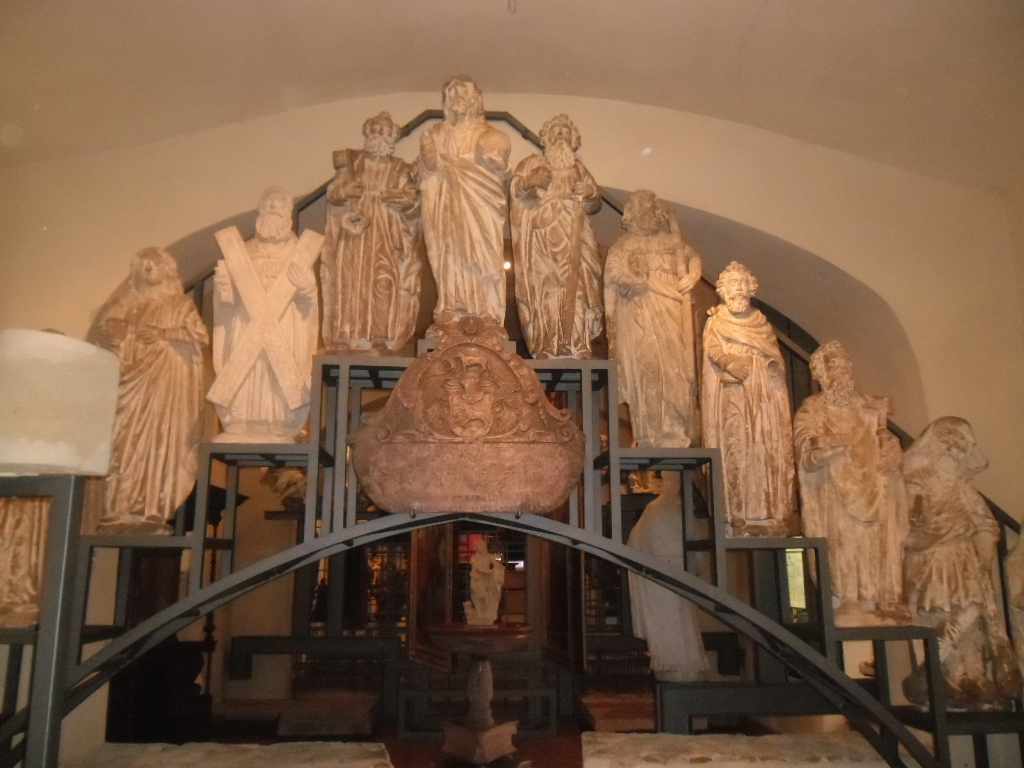
Statues of Portal from Zagreb's Cathedral, 1880s

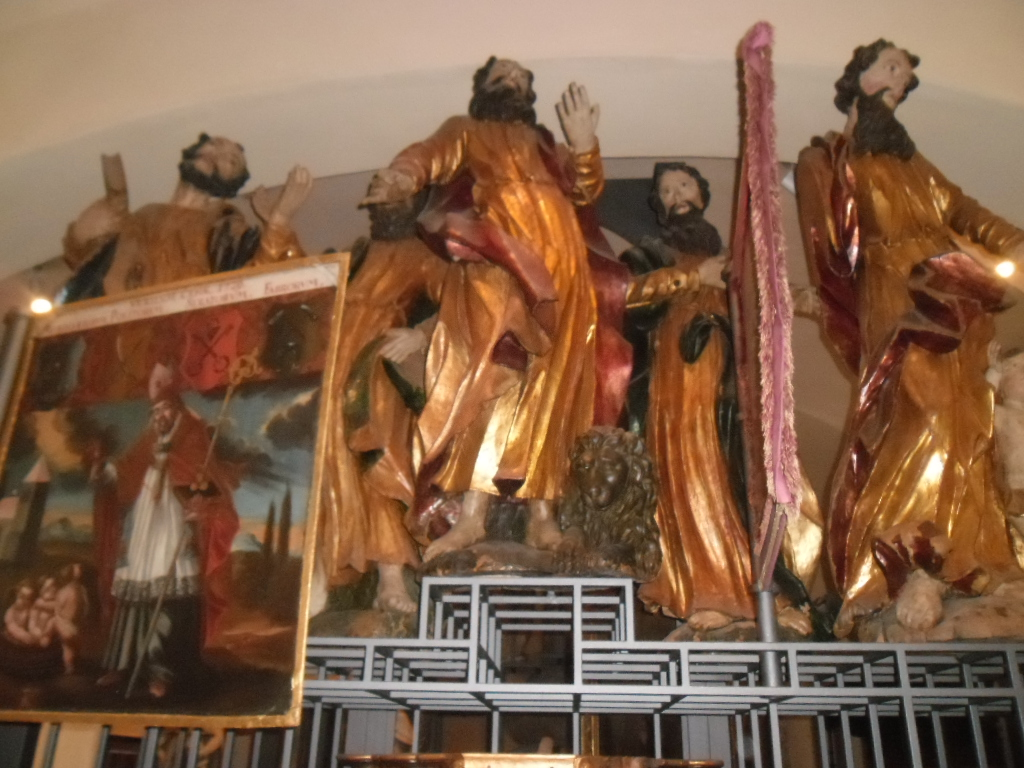
Christian artworks in museum

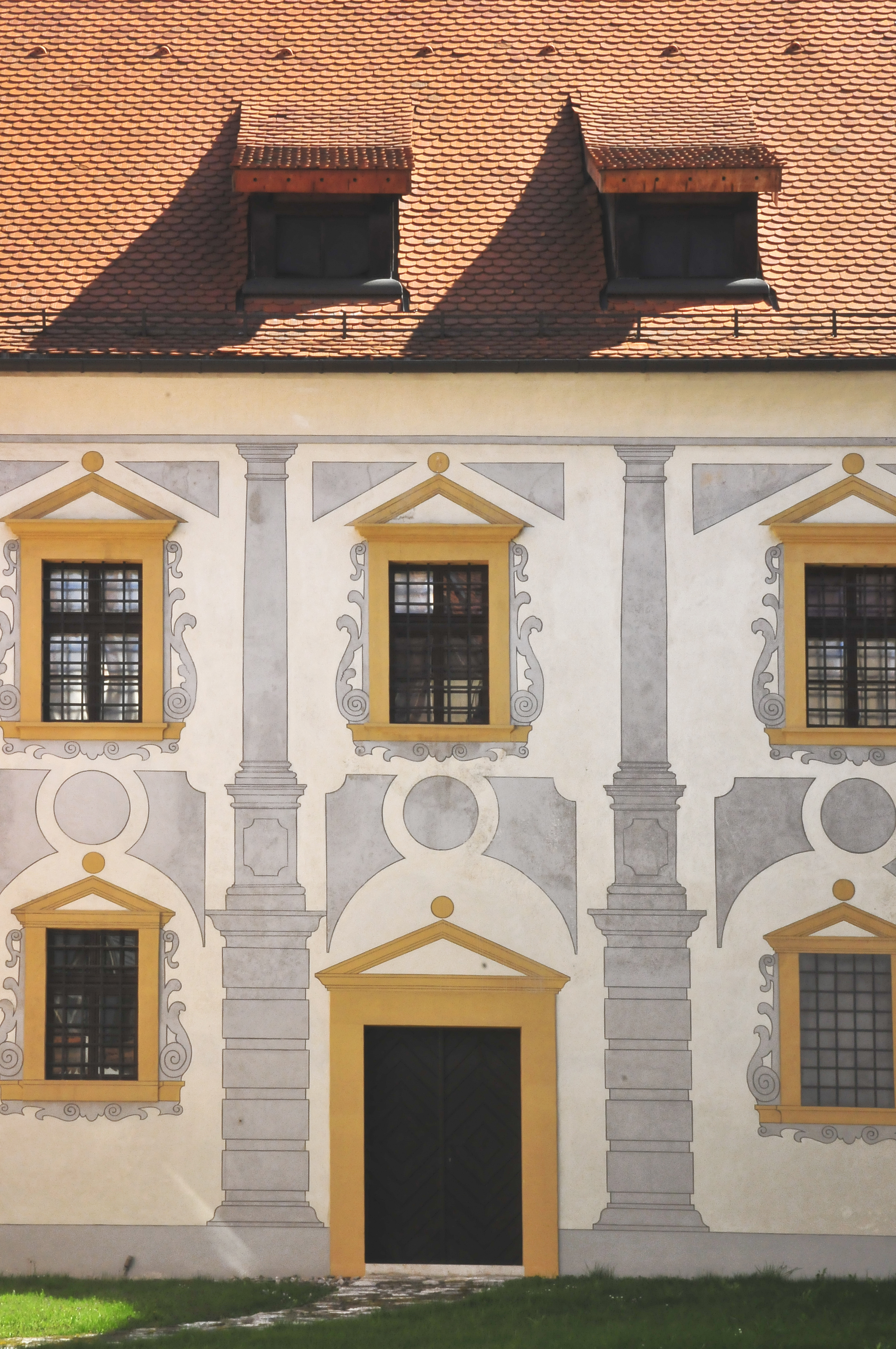
Facade of the Museum

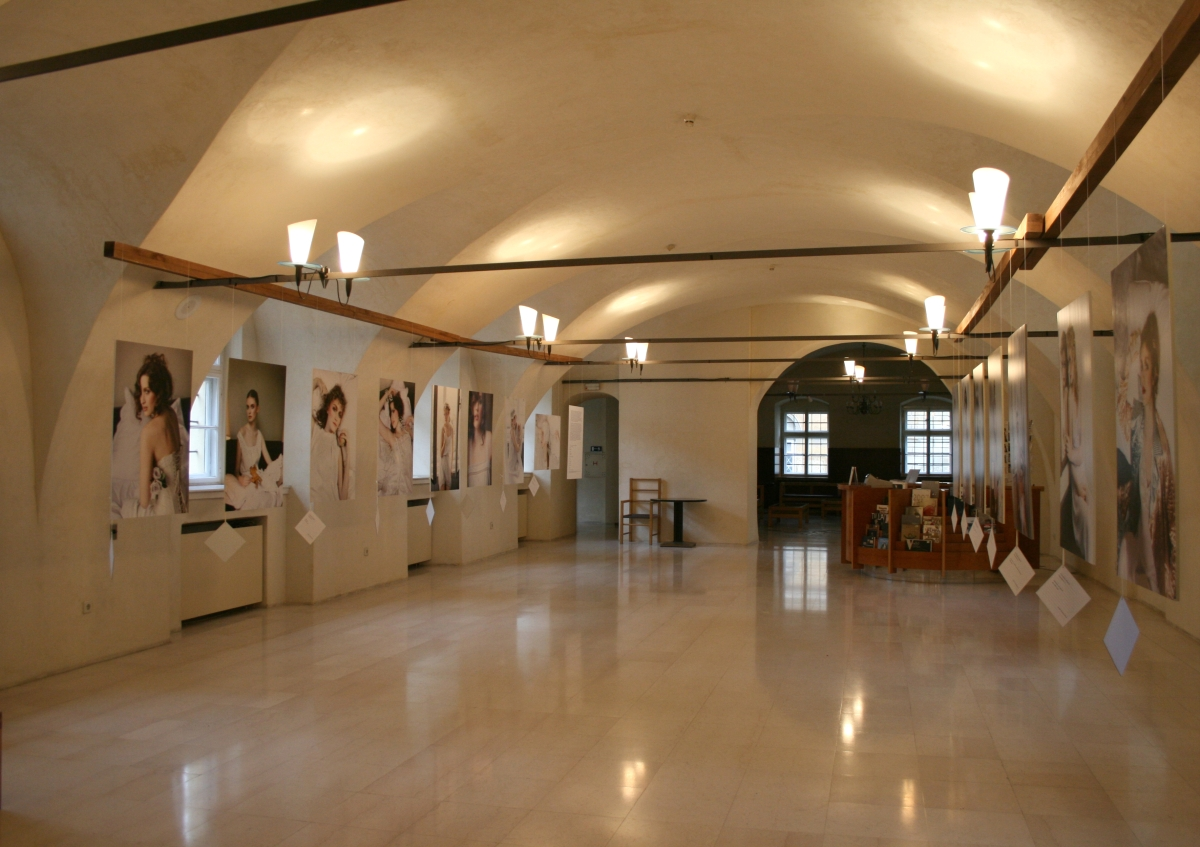
Photography Exhibition

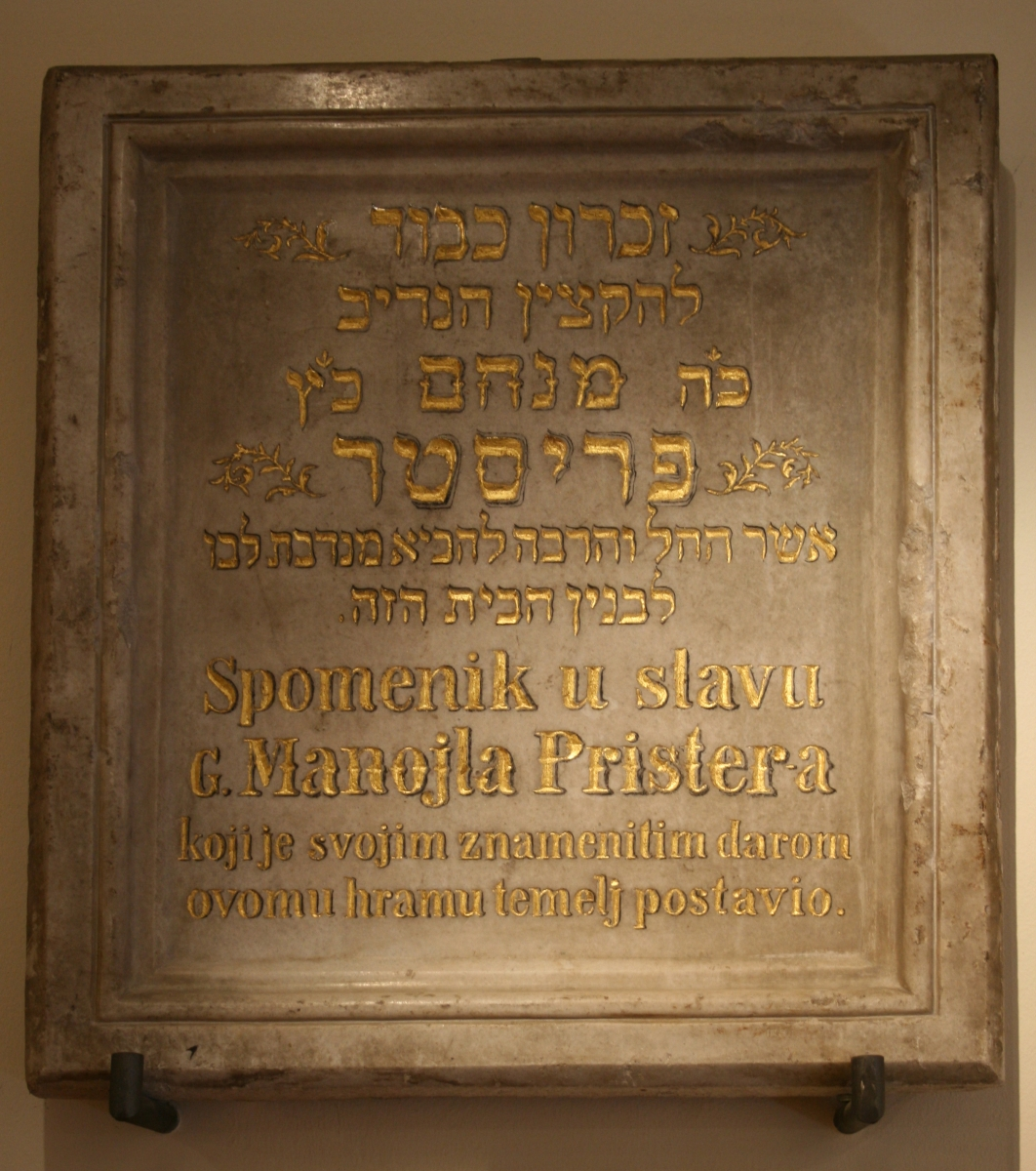
Memorial plaque From Zagreb Synagogue

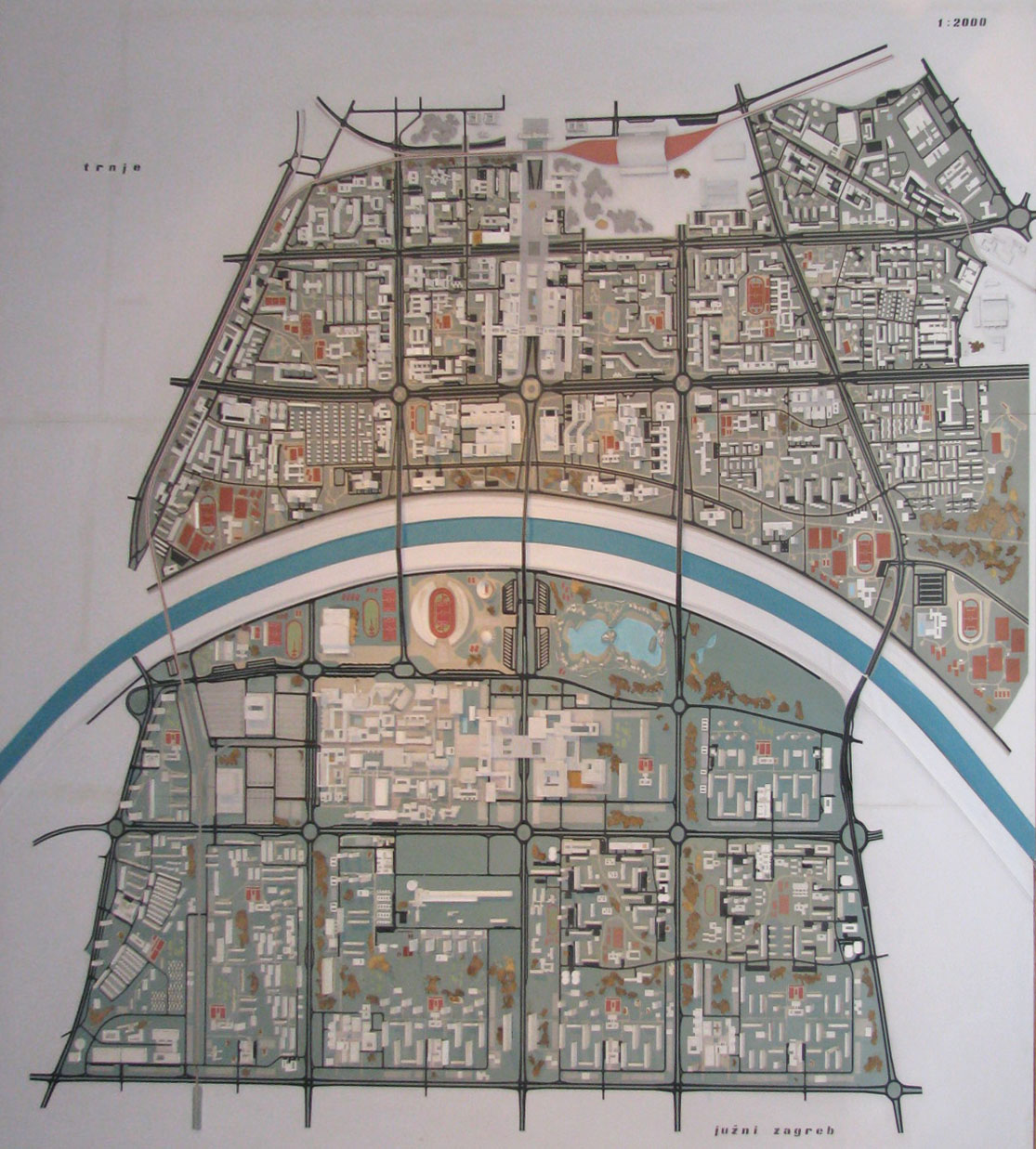
Zagreb City Plan from 1962

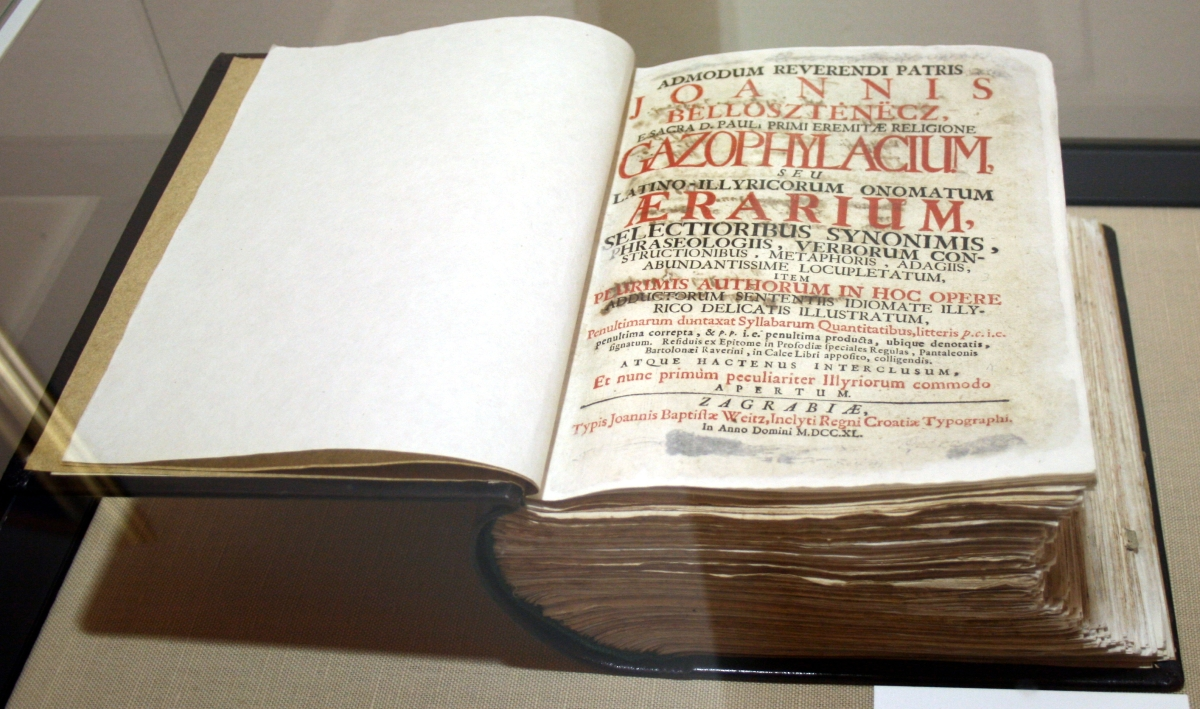
Gazophylacium

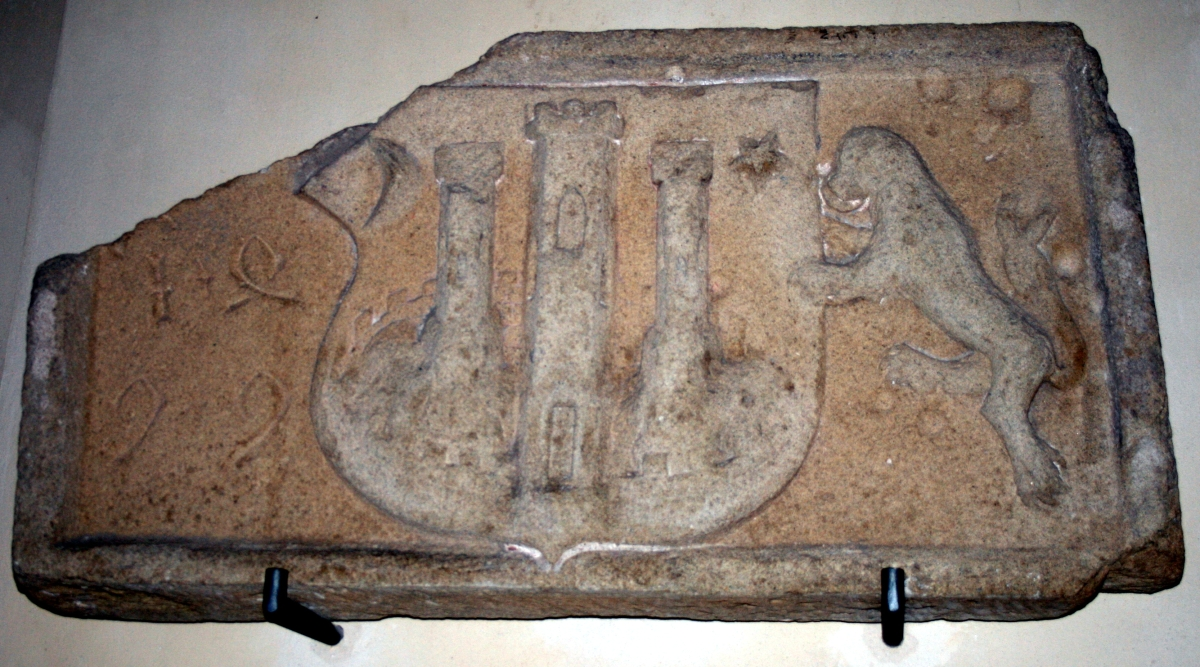
The oldest known Coat of arms of Zagreb from 1499

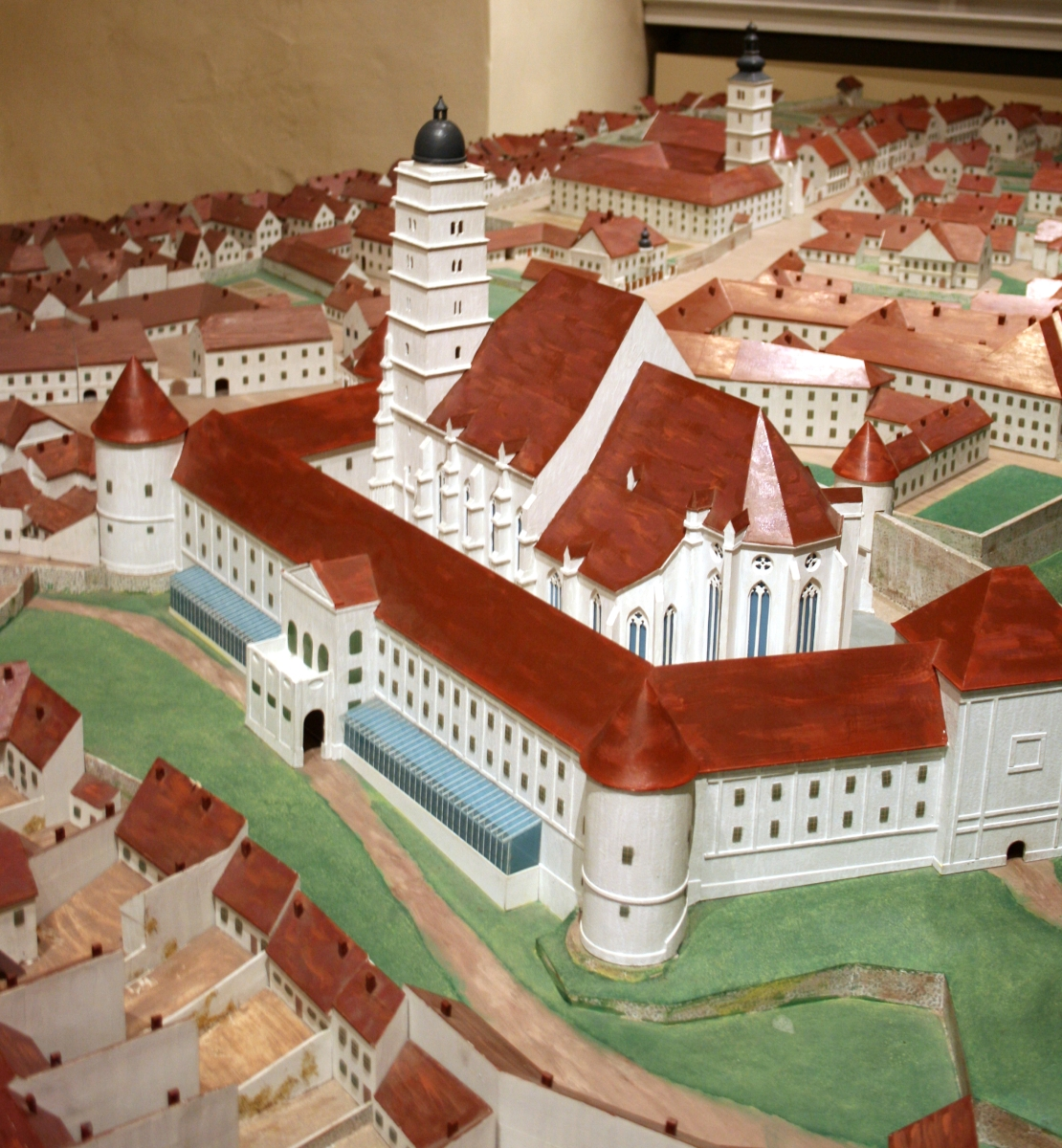
Old model of Zagreb Cathedral before Hermann Bollés reconstruction

== See also ==
- List of museums in Croatia
