= Gornji grad, Zagreb =

Neighbourhood of Zagreb, Croatia

Coordinates: 45°49′00″N 15°58′26″E

Upper Town Gornji grad Gradec
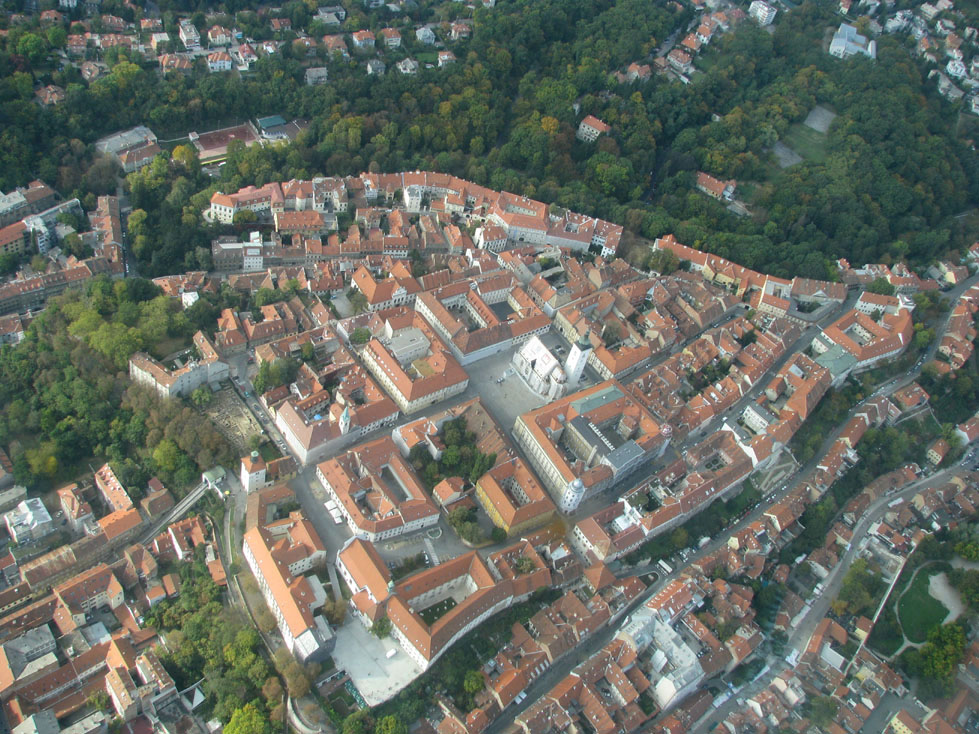
- Aerial view of Gornji Grad (Gradec)
- Interactive map of Upper Town
- Country: Croatia
- City: Gornji Grad-Medveščak, Zagreb
- Established: 11th century

Government
  - Type: Local government

Area
  - Total: 0.85 km^{2} (0.33 sq mi)
  - Land: 0.85 km^{2} (0.33 sq mi)
  - Water: 0 km^{2} (0 sq mi)

Population (2021)
  - Total: 2,137
  - Density: 1,411/km^{2} (3,650/sq mi)
- Time zone: UTC+1 (CET (UTC+1))
- Postal code: 10000
- Area code: +385 1
- Website: Gornji Grad website

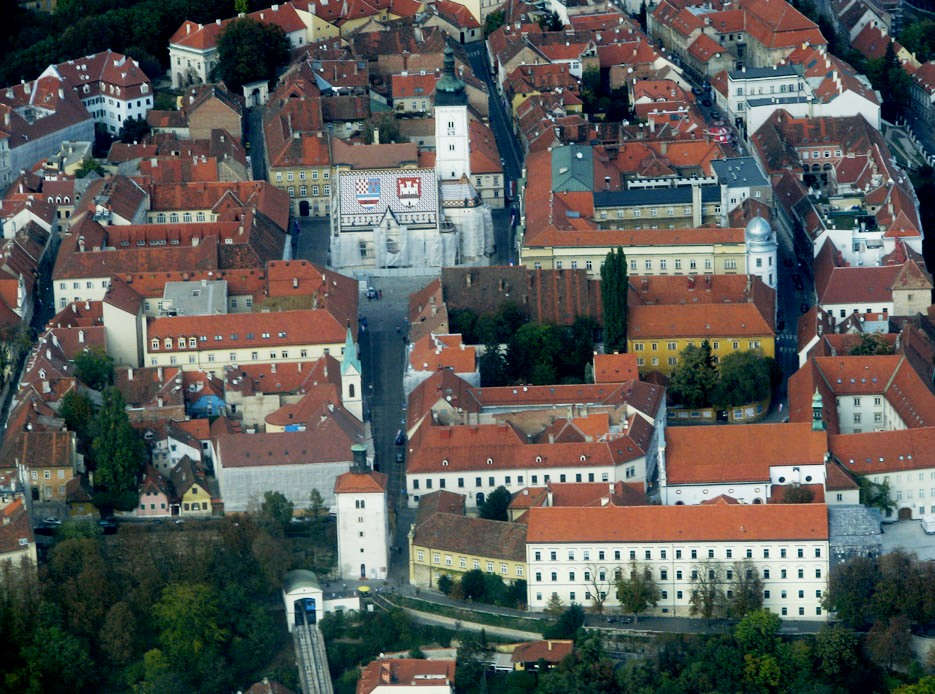
View from the south

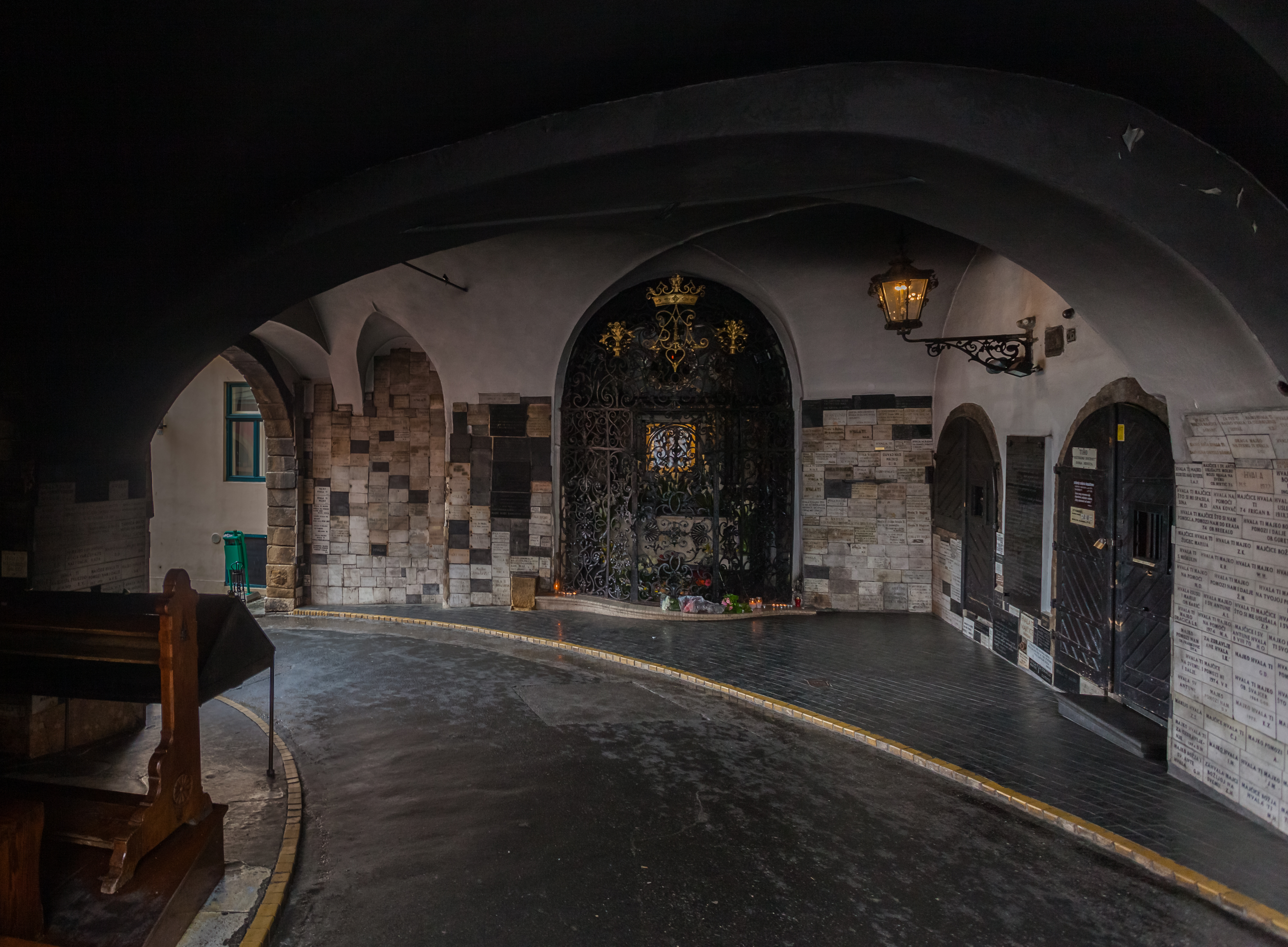
The Stone Gate (Kamenita vrata)

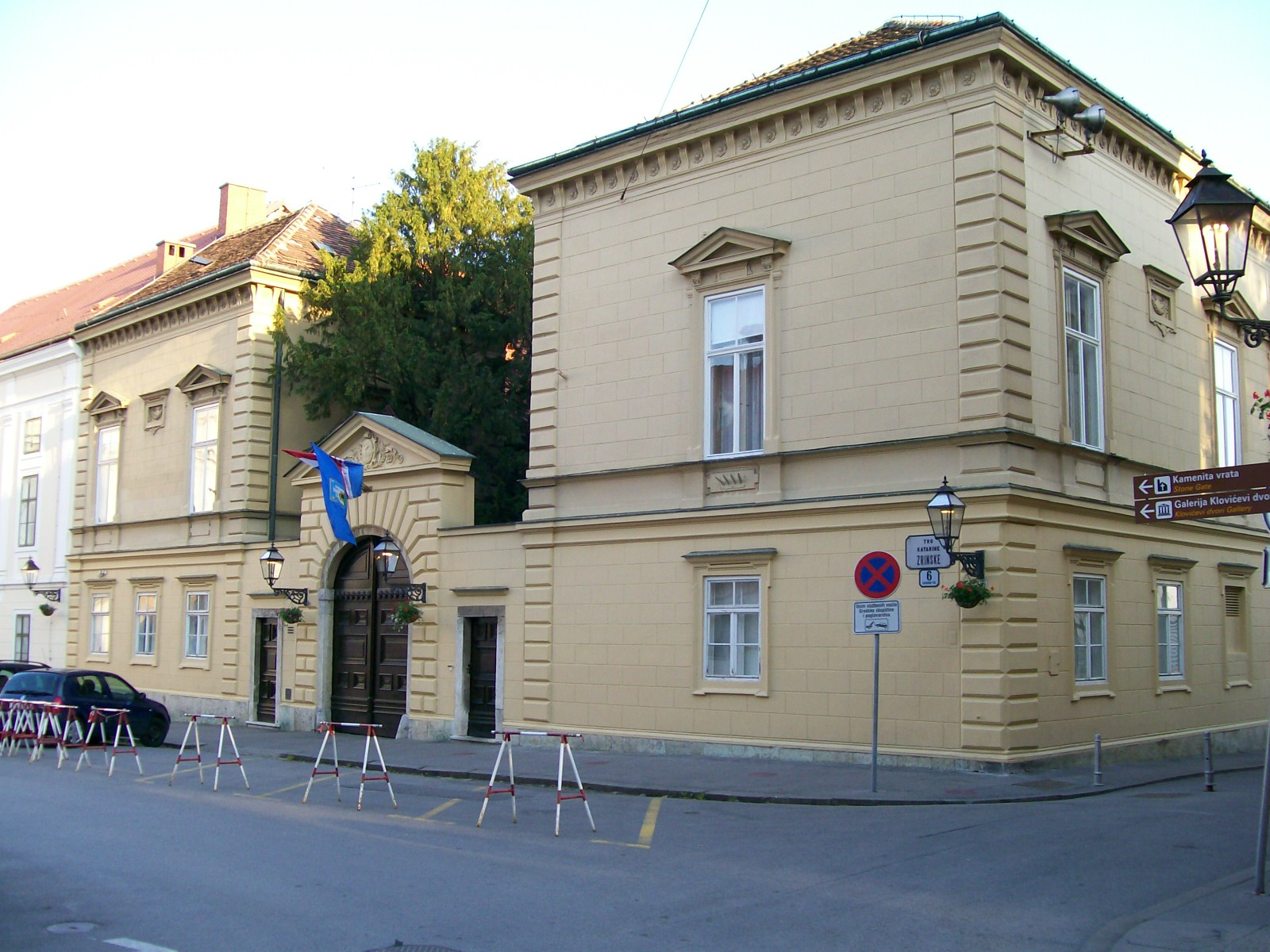
Dverce

Gornji grad (meaning "Upper Town" (Note: Contrasted to Donji grad, "Lower Town")) is a historic part of Zagreb, Croatia, and together with Kaptol it is the medieval nucleus of the city, when it was best known as Gradec (pronounced [grǎdet͡s]) or Grič (pronounced [grîːtʃ], Hungarian: Gréc, Latin: Mons Graecensis prope Zagrabiam). It is situated on the hill of Grič. Today this neighbourhood forms part of the Gornji Grad-Medveščak district. St. Mark's Square is the centre of the Upper Town and St. Mark's Church which is located on the square.

== History ==
Gradec was given a royal charter by King Béla IV in 1242. The royal charter, also called the Golden Bull, was a very important document by which Gradec was declared and proclaimed "a free royal city on Gradec, the hill of Zagreb". This act made Gradec a feudal holding responsible directly to the king. The citizens were given rights of different kinds; among other things they were entitled to elect their own city magistrate (Croatian: gradski sudac) fulfilling the role of mayor. They were also entitled to manage their own affairs.

The citizens engaged in building defensive walls and towers around their settlement, fearing a new Mongol invasion. They completed the defensive system at a time between 1242 and 1261. It could be rightly assumed that by building its fortification walls in the middle of the 13th century, Gradec acquired its outward appearance that can be clearly seen in today's Upper Town (Gornji Grad). The defensive walls enclosed the settlement in the shape of a triangle, its top located near the tower called Popov toranj and its base at the south wall (today's Strossmayer Promenade) and Lotrščak tower, which could be explained by the shape of the hill. In some places, rectangular and semicircular towers fortified the defensive walls.

There were four main gates leading to the town: the west gate in the Mesnička Street, the new north gate, later known as the Opatička Street gate, Dverce in the south and the Kamenita vrata (English: Stone gate) in the east. Kamenita vrata is the only gate still preserved to date.

== Gornji grad today ==
Gornji grad is a local government unit, encompassing a population of 2,137 (as of 2021), and extending further north on a foothill of Medvednica along the Jurjevska street, up to Cmrok and Tuškanac.

Undoubtedly, the focal point of Gornji Grad is the square around St. Mark's Church that had been called St. Mark's Square for years. St. Mark's Church is the parish church of Old Zagreb. When guilds developed in Gradec in the 15th, and later in the 17th century, being the societies of craftsmen, their members including masters, journeymen and apprentices would gather regularly in St. Mark's Church.

On the opposite side of the Square at the corner of Basaričekova Street lies the St. Mark's parish office. The house has been standing there since the 16th century, although it underwent reconstruction in the 18th century and had an extension added in the 19th century. At the west end of St. Mark's Square, the mansion called Banski dvori, the former residence of the Civil Governor of Croatia (Croatian: Ban), was built at the beginning of the 19th century and yet, it can be classed among the Zagreb antiquities. Banski dvori, along with the Baroque mansion beside it, is the seat of the Government of the Republic of Croatia. Since 1734, the Croatian Parliament has taken up the east side of St. Mark's Square.

In 2008, Gornji Grad was closed to car traffic except for residents, making it a primarily pedestrian zone. In 2014, Zagreb Administrative Court struck down the order prohibiting other cars from parking at residents' parking spaces, and car access and parking was again allowed on Gornji Grad, albeit at a hefty fee for non-residents.

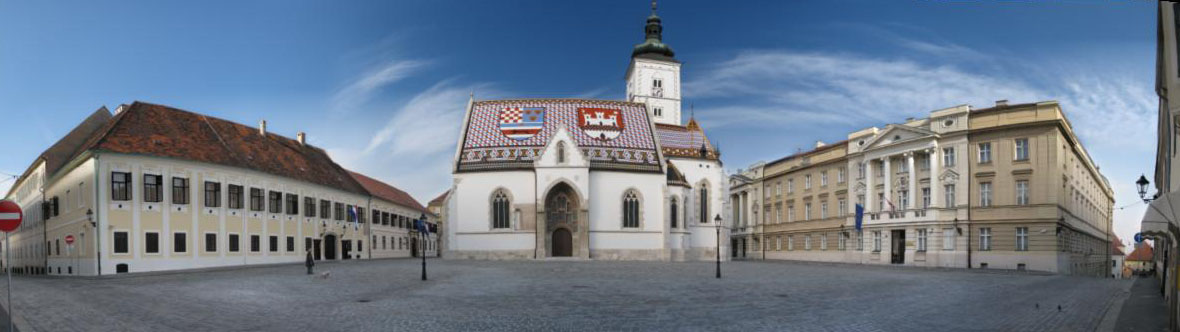
St. Mark's Square

== Climate ==
Since records began in 1881, the highest temperature recorded at the Grič weather station at an elevation of 157 metres (515 ft) was 40.3 °C (104.5 °F), on 5 July 1950. The coldest temperature was −22.2 °C (−8.0 °F), on 24 January 1942.

== See also ==
- History of Zagreb
- History of Croatia
- Zagreb cathedral
- Kaptol
- Ban Jelačić Square
- Grič cannon
- Grič Tunnel

== Views of Gradec ==
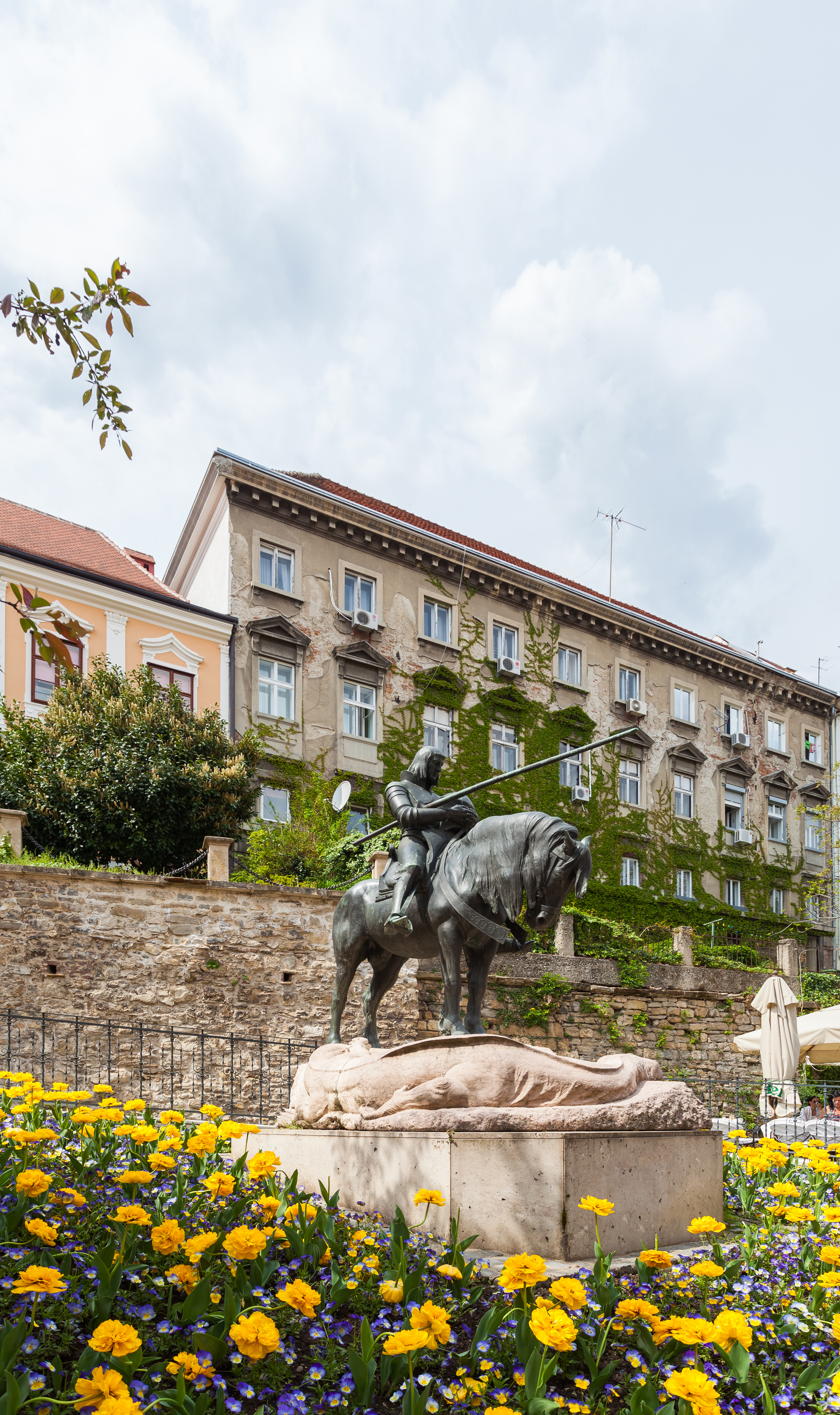
The statue of St George killing the dragon

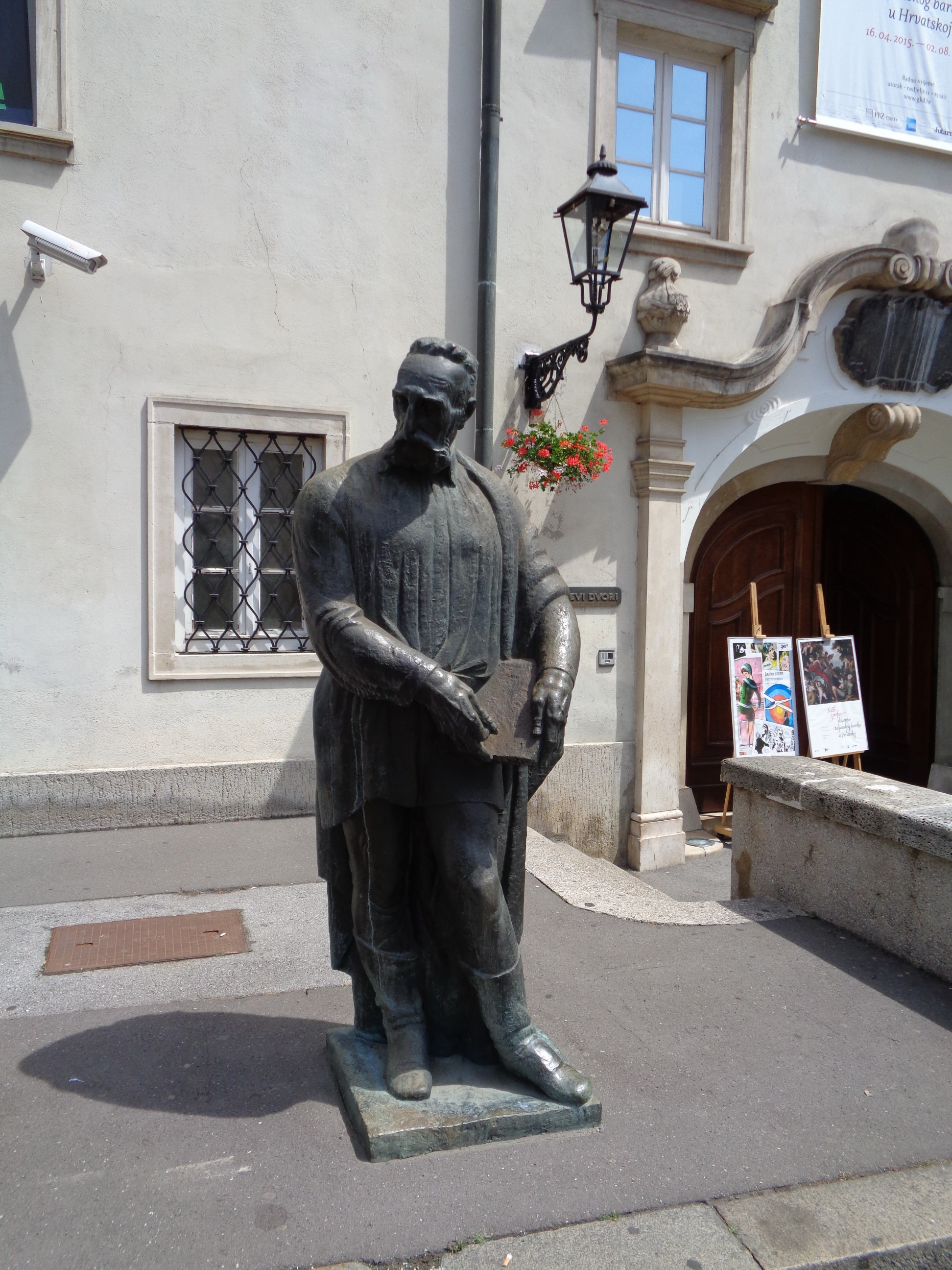
Juraj Julije Klović statue in front of the eponymous gallery

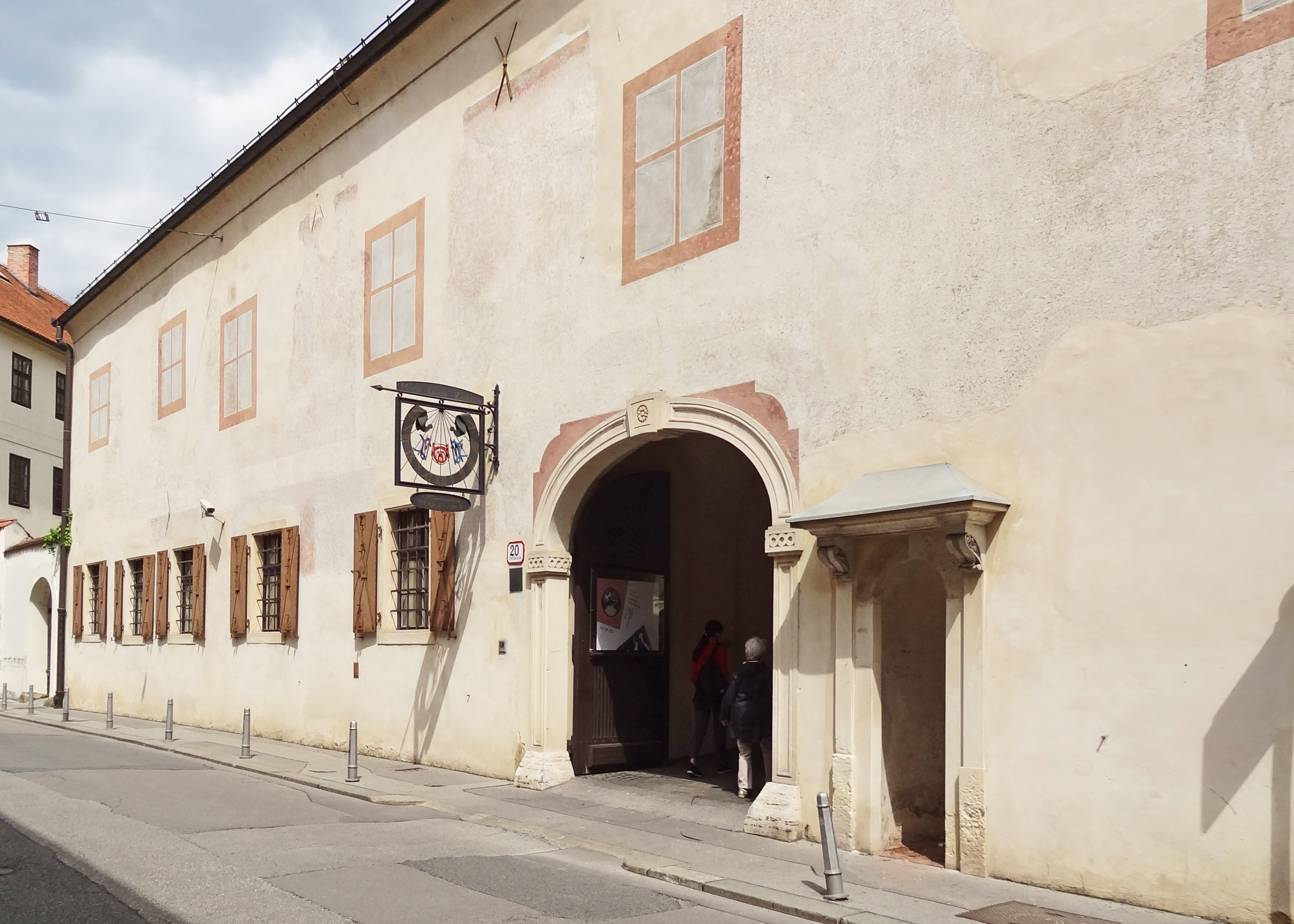
Zagreb City Museum

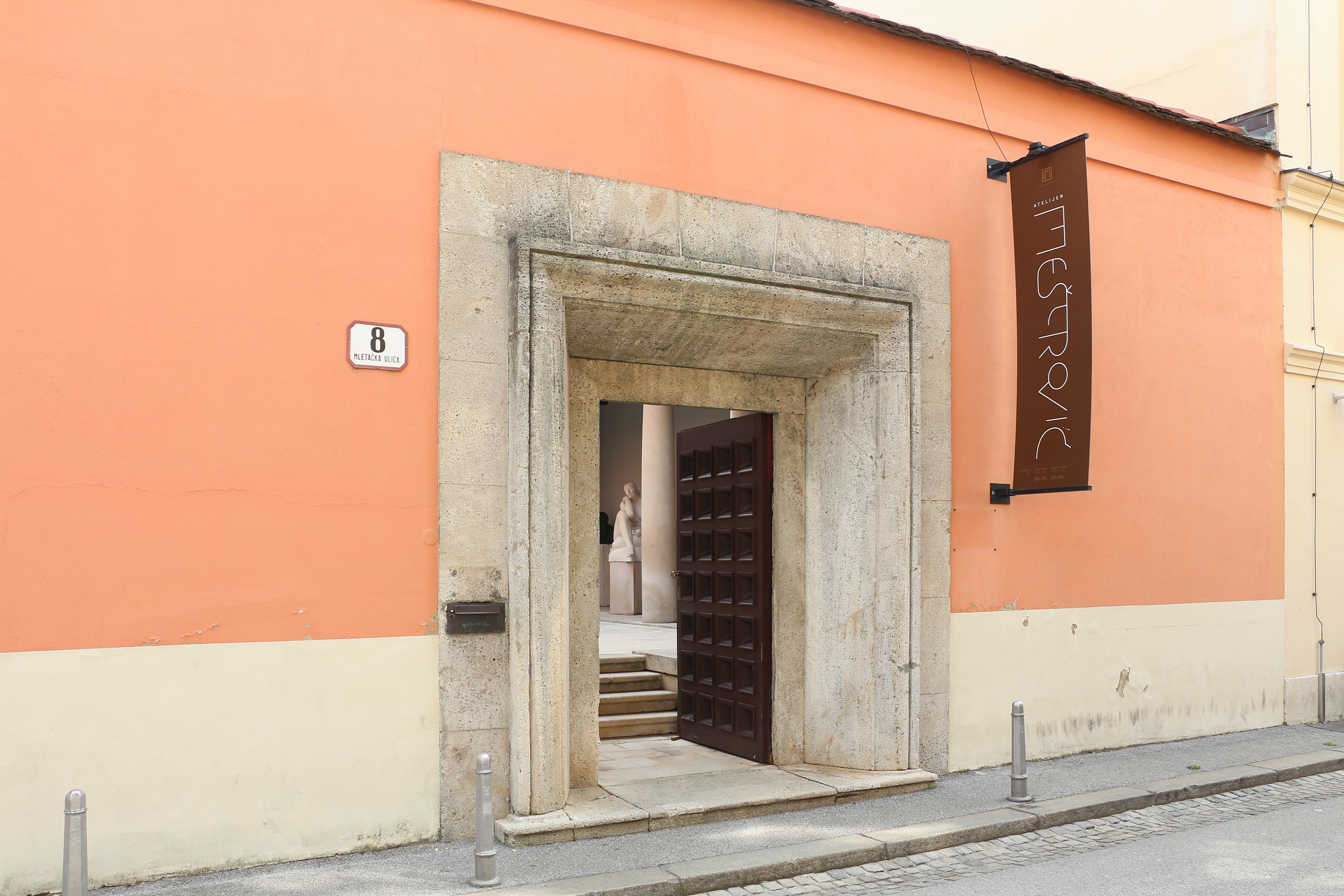
Meštrović Atelier
