= Ban Jelačić Square =

Square in Zagreb, Croatia

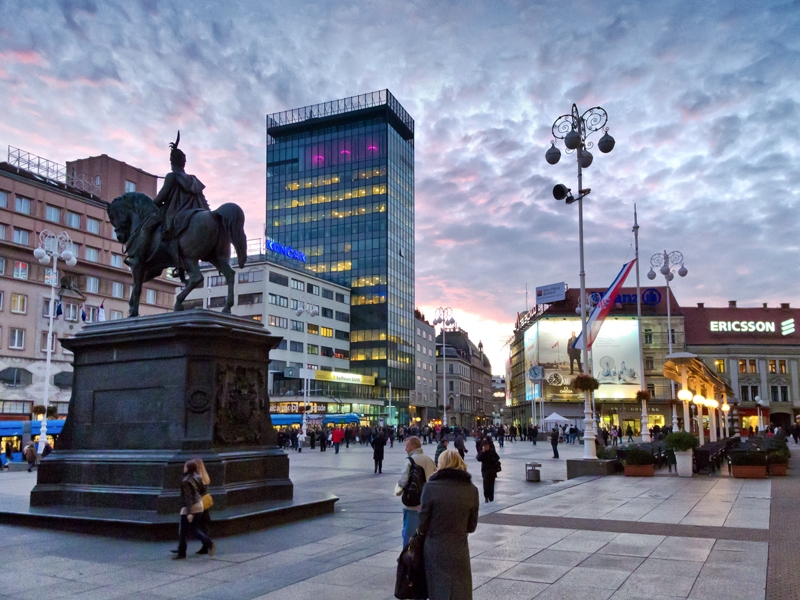
- Southwest view of the Square
- Interactive map of Ban Jelačić Square
- Native name: Trg bana Jelačića (Croatian)
- Former names: Harmica (until 1848); Republic Square (1946–1990)
- Namesake: Ban Josip Jelačić
- Location: Donji grad, Zagreb, Croatia
- Coordinates: 45°48′47″N 15°58′38″E
- North: Splavnica and Harmica streets
- East: Jurišićeva Street
- South: Praška and Gajeva streets
- West: Ilica Street

Construction
- Completion: c. 17th century

Ban Jelačić Square (pronounced [bâːn jɛ̌lat͡ʃit͡ɕ]; Croatian: Trg bana Jelačića) is the central square of the city of Zagreb, Croatia, named after ban Josip Jelačić. Its official name is Trg bana Josipa Jelačića and is colloquially called 'Jelačić plac'.

The square is located below Zagreb's old city cores Gradec and Kaptol, just directly south of the Dolac Market on the intersection of Ilica from the west. Radićeva Street is from the northwest, the small streets Splavnica and Harmica from the north, Bakačeva Street from the northeast, Jurišićeva Street from the east, Praška Street from the southeast and Gajeva Street from the southwest. It is the center of the Zagreb Downtown pedestrian zone.

Today, Ban Jelačić Square is the lively center of Zagreb, popular meeting spot and serves as an important commercial, social, and transportation hub. The square is surrounded by historic buildings and contains the Manduševac fountain, which occupies the site of a former well that once supplied water to the city’s residents. It is also a major meeting point for locals and visitors and is connected to other parts of Zagreb through the city's tram network. The surrounding area includes numerous shops, cafés, and restaurants, contributing to the square’s role as a focal point of urban life in Zagreb.

== Name ==
Ban Jelačić Square has undergone several name changes throughout its history. Its earliest known name was Harmica, a term derived from Hungarian that refers to a tax. At that time, however, the area was not a city square as we know it today. Instead, it functioned as a marketplace located below what is now Zagreb’s Upper Town. The name Harmica originated from a tax that merchants were required to pay in order to sell their goods at the market. Because Harmica lay between the Upper and Lower Town, it naturally evolved into an important meeting point and eventually developed into the city’s main square. Today, it survives as the name of a passageway leading to Dolac Market, Zagreb’s famous open-air market.

The square received its current name, Ban Jelačić Square, in honor of ban Josip Jelačić, one of the most influential Croatian political figures of the 19th century. Widely regarded as a national hero, Jelačić played a significant role in Croatian history through his political achievements and reforms. A statue of him was erected in the square in 1886, and the square was subsequently named after him. Following the Second World War, in 1946, the square was renamed Republic Square (Trg Republike), and Jelačić's statue was removed from public view for political reasons during the period when Croatia was part of Yugoslavia. In 1990, on the eve of Croatian independence, the square regained its historic name, and the statue was returned to its original location.

== History ==
Postcard of Ban Jelačić Square in Zagreb under the Habsburgs, at the end of the 19th century

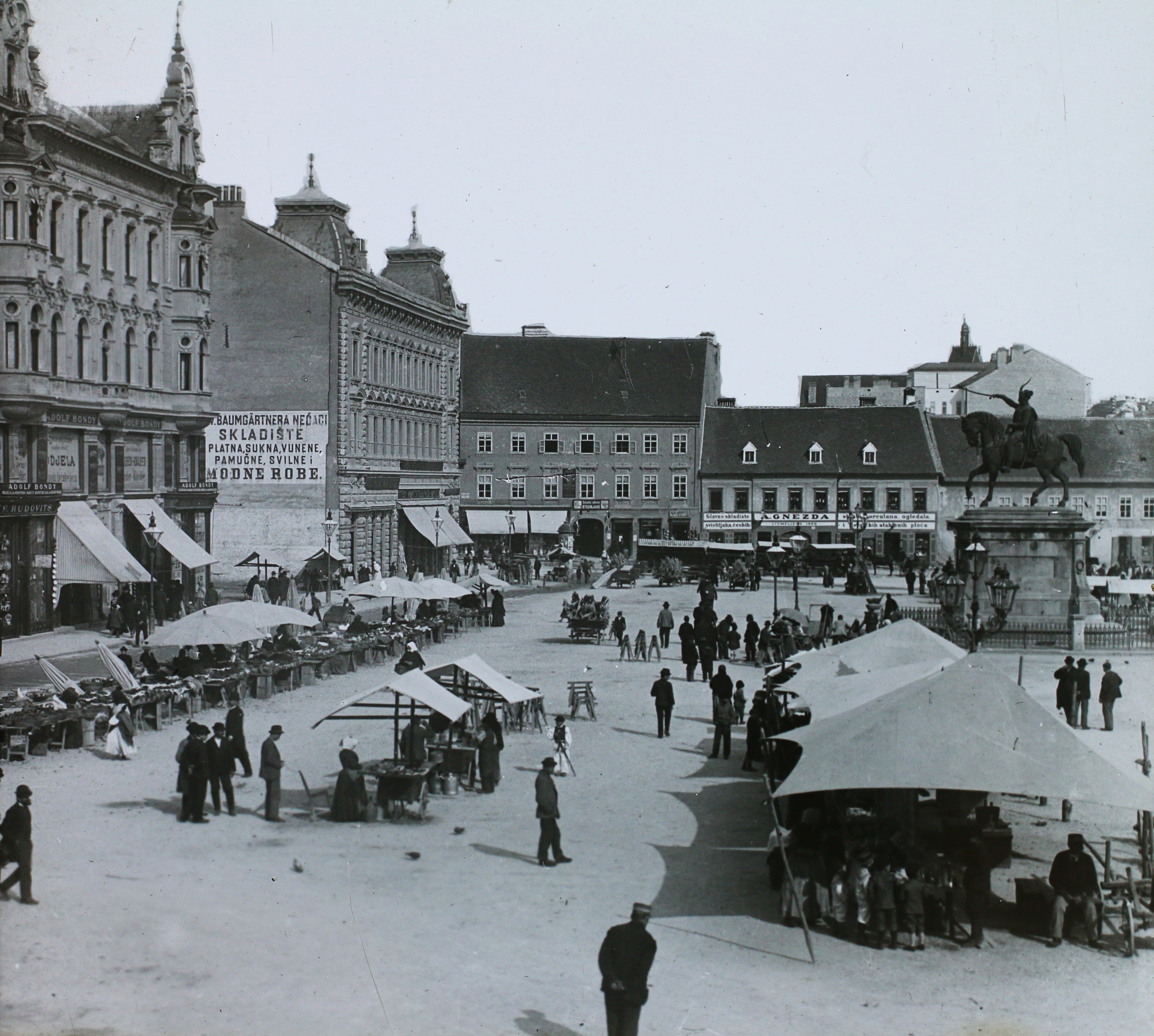
Jelačić square, 1902

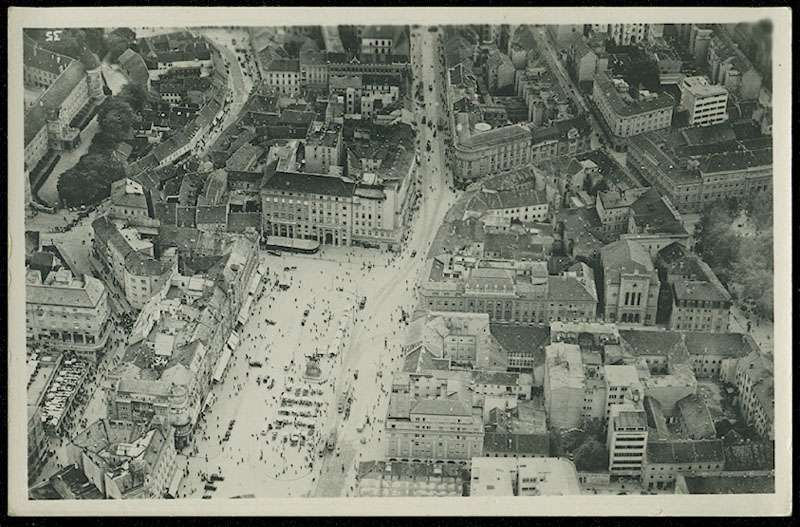
Jelačić square, 1933

The history of Ban Jelačić Square begins in 1641, when a new marketplace was established on a plain below Gradec and Kaptol, near the Manduševac spring. Initially known as Manduševec, the area gradually developed as buildings and access roads were constructed around the marketplace and later became known as Harmica. For centuries, Harmica served as a transit point and marketplace through which merchandise passed on its way to the fairs of Kaptol and Gradec. The oldest surviving building on the square, located at 1 Ban Jelačić Square, dates from the 18th century.

The square's later prominence was shaped both by the economic growth of merchants and wholesalers during the first half of the 19th century and by its association with Josip Jelačić, Croatia’s most renowned ban. In 1826, the cattle market was relocated to the site of present-day Zrinjevac Park, although groceries transported to Harmica by cart continued to be sold there until 1858. In 1848, the square was renamed Ban Jelačić Square in honor of Josip Jelačić. Its modern identity was further established on 19 October 1866, when a monumental equestrian statue of Jelačić, created by Austrian sculptor Anton Dominik Fernkorn, was erected by Austrian authorities despite protests from members of the Zagreb city council. The monument also generated opposition among Hungarians, who regarded Jelačić as a traitor. A horsecar line was introduced along the southern side of the square in 1891, and between 1910 and 1911 horse-drawn transport was replaced by electric trams.

Over time, the square became the focal point of Zagreb’s public life and witnessed many significant political and social events. It was the site of the welcome extended to the Ustaša regime in 1941 and the entry of Partisan forces into Zagreb in 1945. The following year, Jelačić’s statue was removed after the communist authorities of SFR Yugoslavia denounced him as a “servant of foreign interests.” The monument was preserved in the cellar of the Gliptoteka gallery by its curator, Antun Bauer. Following the Second World War, motor vehicle traffic through the square steadily increased, although in 1975 the square was converted into a car-free zone. With the independence of the Republic of Croatia in 1990, both the statue and the historic name Ban Jelačić Square were restored. Today, the square functions as Zagreb’s principal public gathering place, a major public transport hub, and a symbol of the city’s social, political, and historical development. .

=== Modern square ===
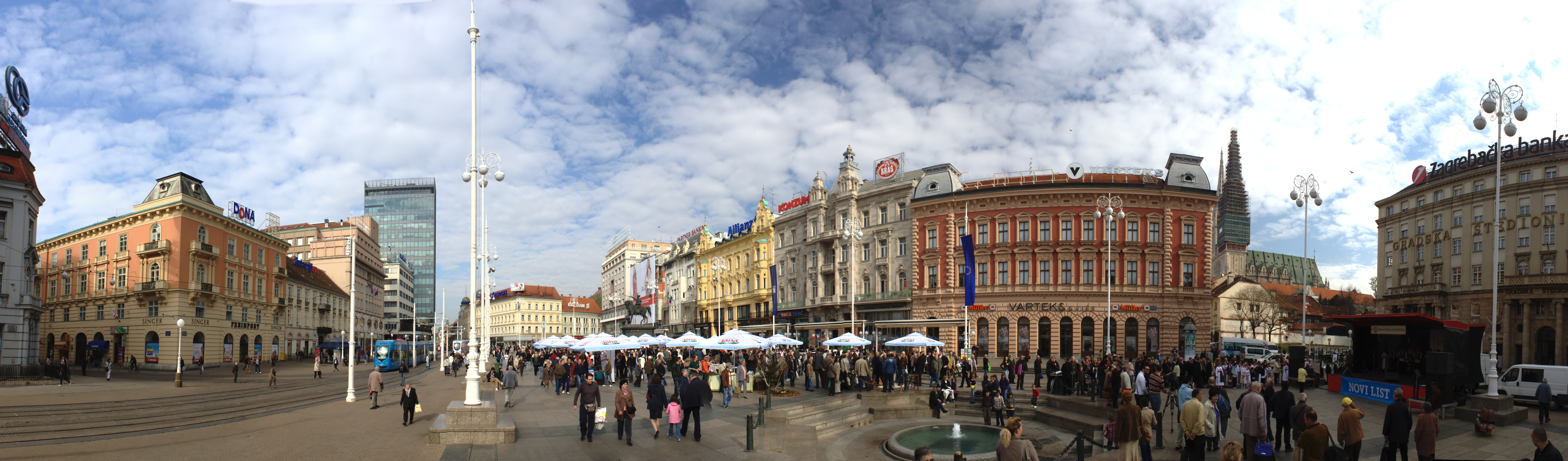
Panoramic image of the square.

The present-day square features buildings belonging to different architectural styles ranging from classicism, secession, and modernism. Many of them have antique façades which require renovation. This makes them a common target for advertisers, who cover the construction work with large posters. The 1987 Summer Universiade (World University Games) was held in Zagreb. The city used the event to renovate and revitalize the city. The square was repaved with stone blocks and made part of the downtown pedestrian zone. A part of the Medveščak stream, which had been running under the sewers since 1898, was uncovered by some workers in the area. This part formed the Manduševac fountain that was also covered in 1898.

On 11 October 1990, during the breakup of Yugoslavia and after 1990 elections in Croatia, Jelačić's historic role had again been considered positive and the statue was returned to the square but on the north portion facing the south. The name of the square was again changed to be named after Josip Jelačić.

Jelačić Square is the most common meeting place for people in Zagreb. Being a part of the pedestrian zone, it is inaccessible by car, but it is the main hub for trams. ZET tram lines 1, 6, 11, 12, 13, 14, 17 traverse it by day, and 31, 32 and 34 by night.

The square features the Manduševac fountain located in its eastern part. The square is adorned with Christmas trees and lights during Advent.

== Statue ==
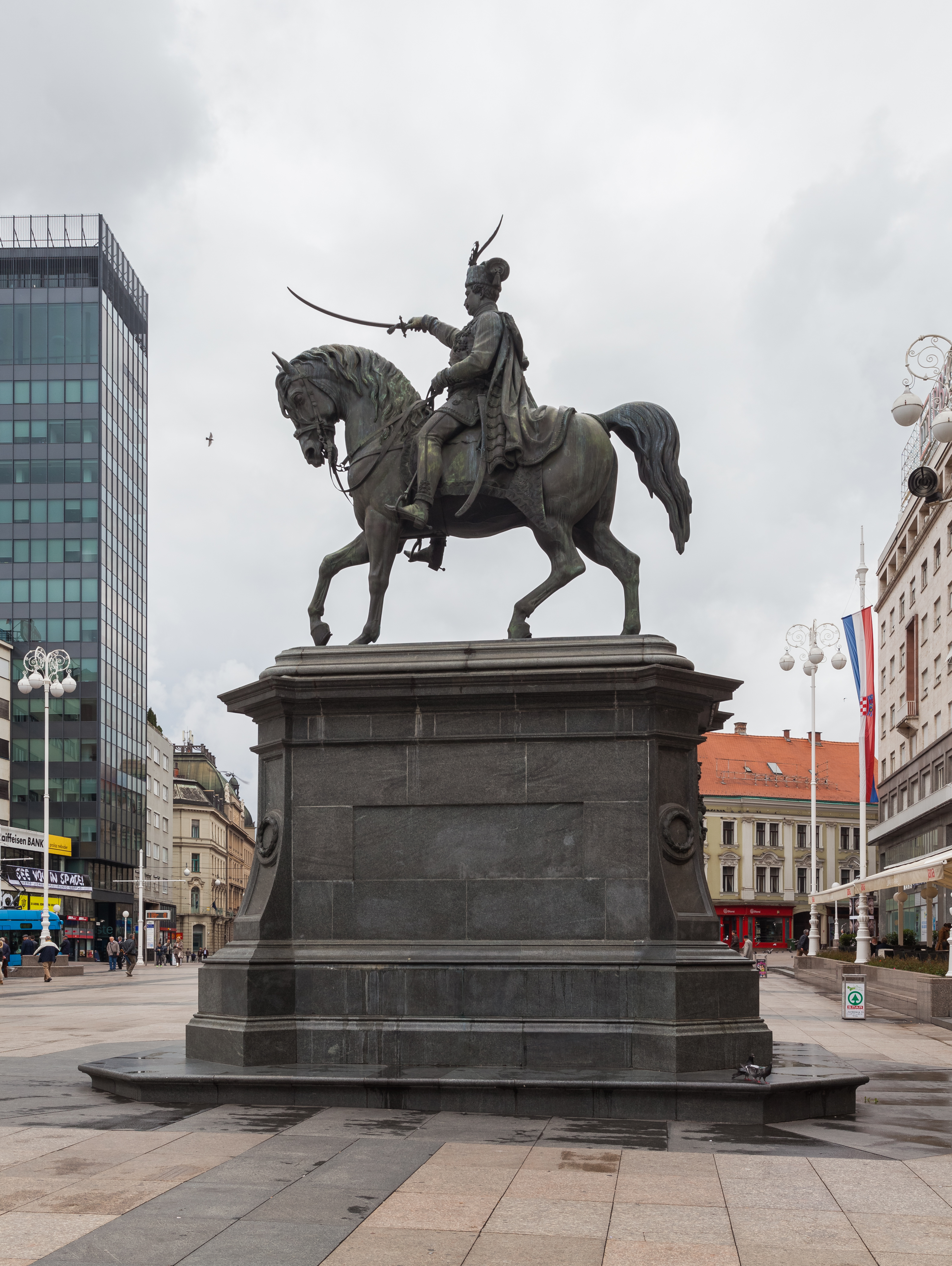
Ban Josip Jelačić statue, made by Austrian sculptor Anton Dominik Fernkorn

The square's most prominent landmark is the equestrian statue of Josip Jelačić, created by Austrian sculptor Anton Dominik Fernkorn. Unveiled on 16 December 1866, seven years after Jelačić's death, the monument depicts the ban on horseback, holding a sabre in his outstretched right hand. The horse portrayed in the sculpture, named Emir, had been given to Jelačić by Mahmud-beg Bašić of Bihać and served as Fernkorn's model for the monument. Today, the statue is one of the principal symbols of Zagreb.

The monument has undergone several changes during its history. Although a popular myth claims that the statue originally faced north towards Hungary, it was in fact oriented towards Gradec, then the most densely populated part of the city. In 1947, the communist authorities of SFR Yugoslavia removed the statue and placed it in storage. Following a public petition and the political changes of 1990, the monument was returned to Ban Jelačić Square and ceremonially unveiled on 16 October, Jelačić's birthday. Upon its restoration, the statue was reoriented to face south, where it remains today.

== Gallery ==
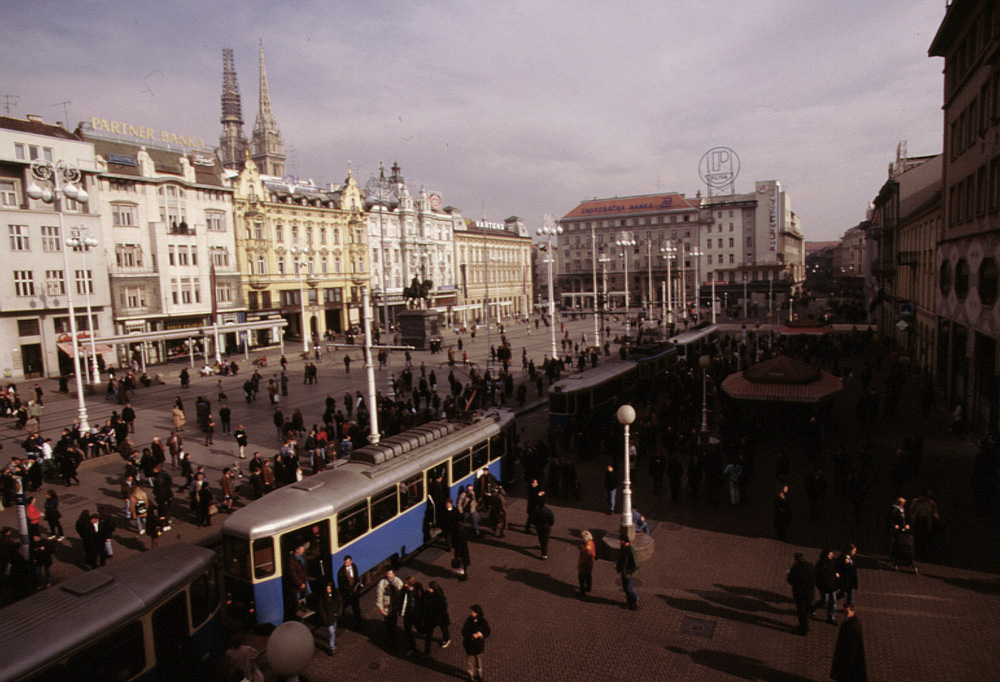
Square, 1990

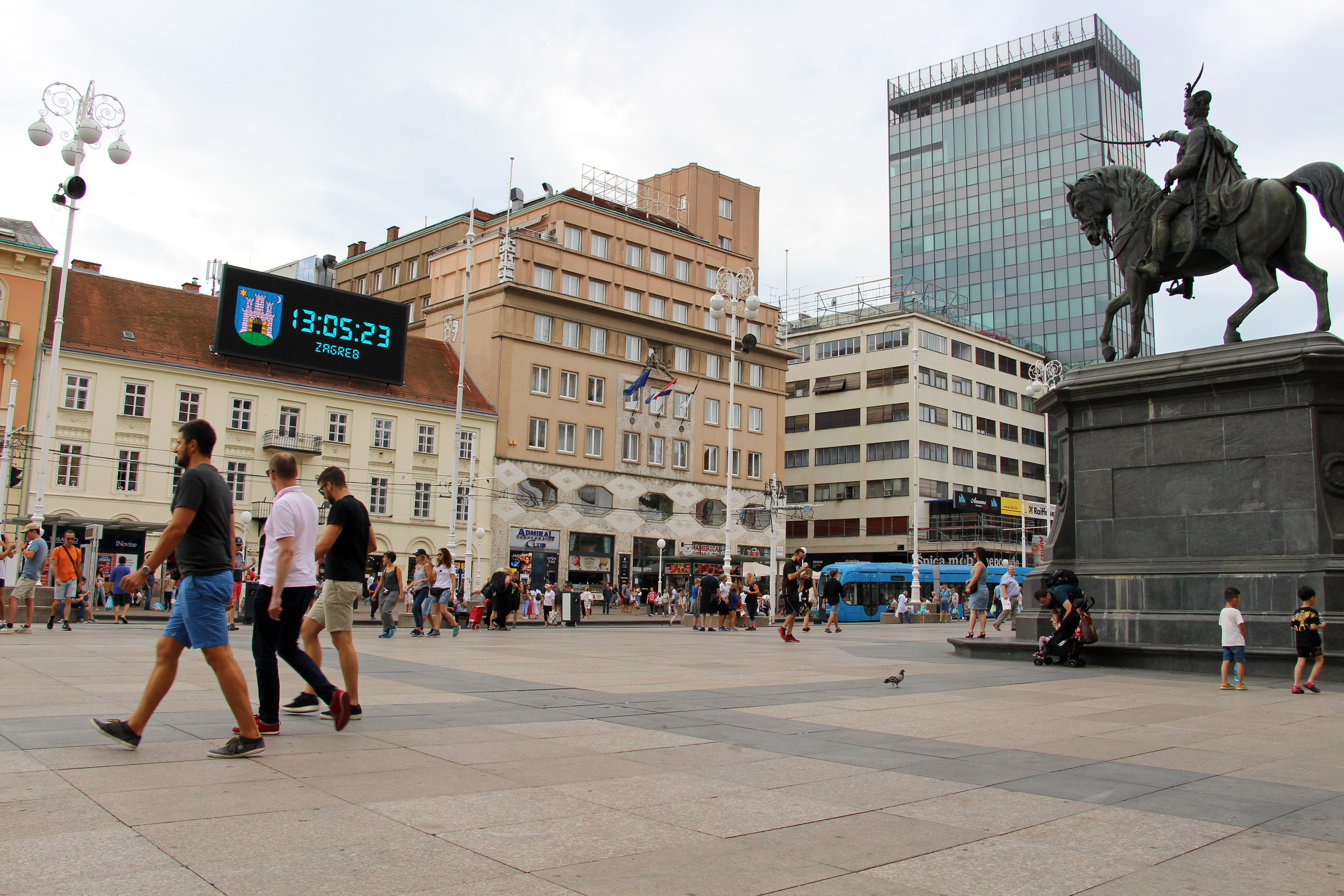
South-West view of the Square

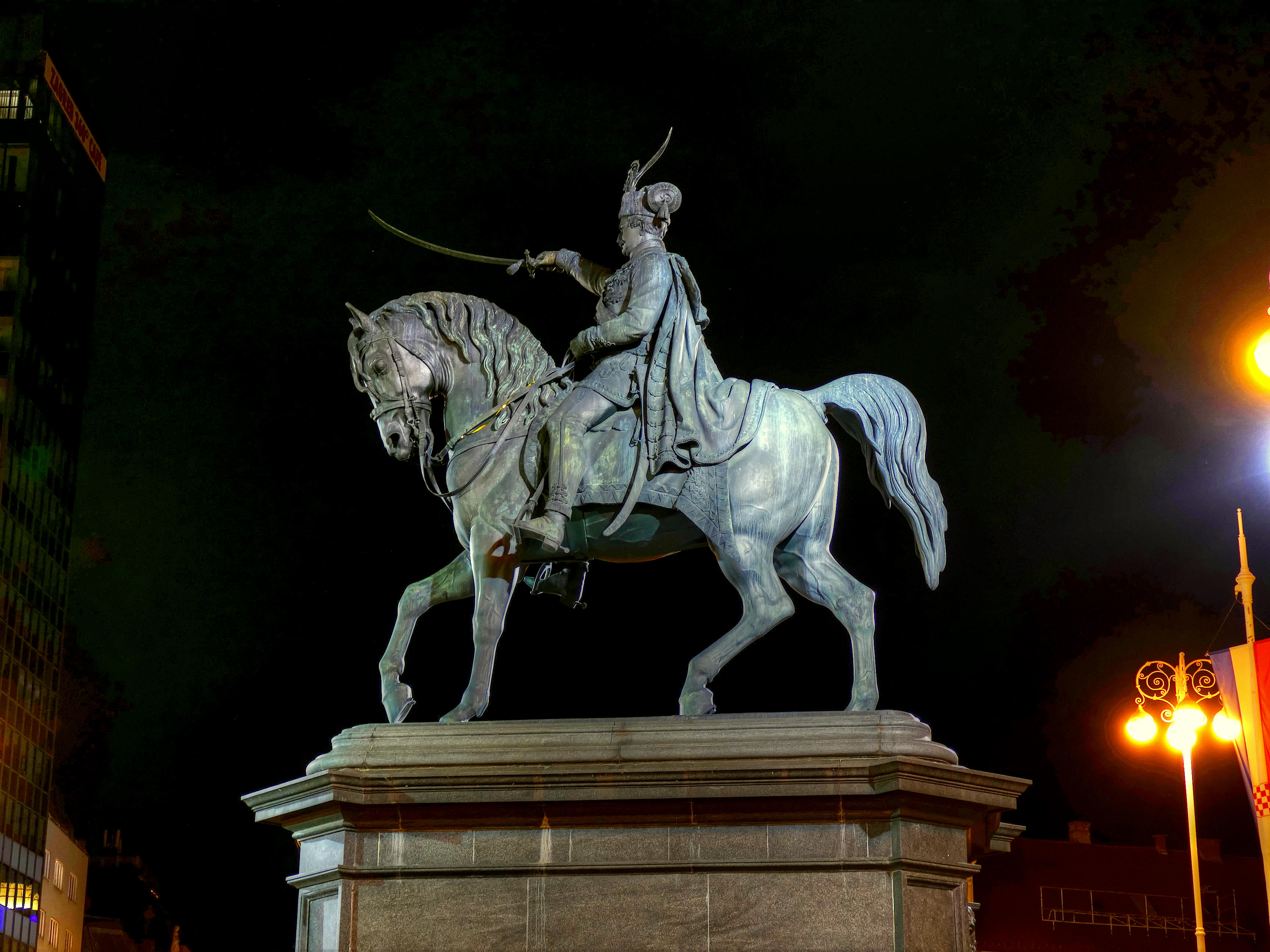
Ban Jelačić statue

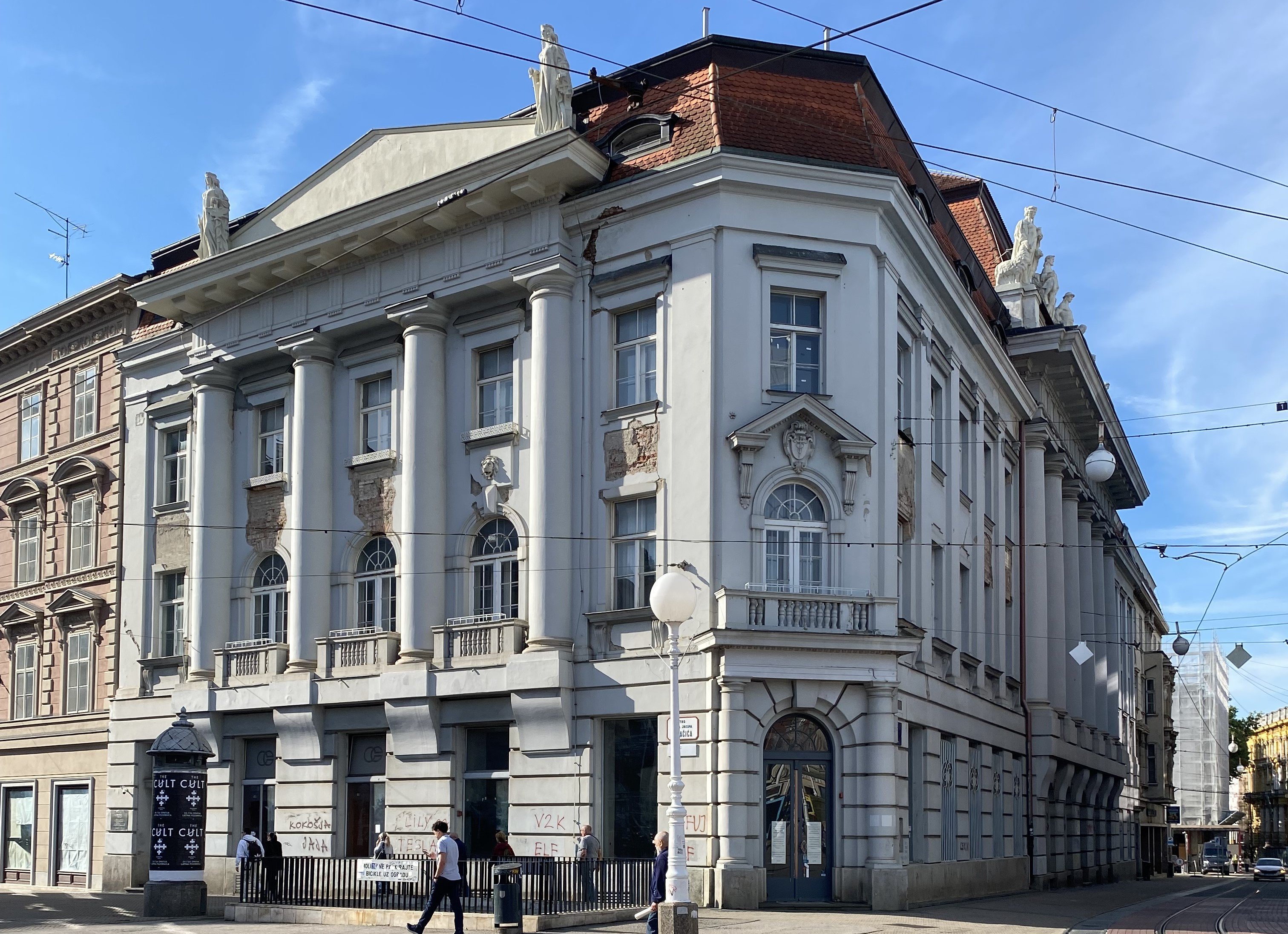
Former Jugoslavian Bank on the Square

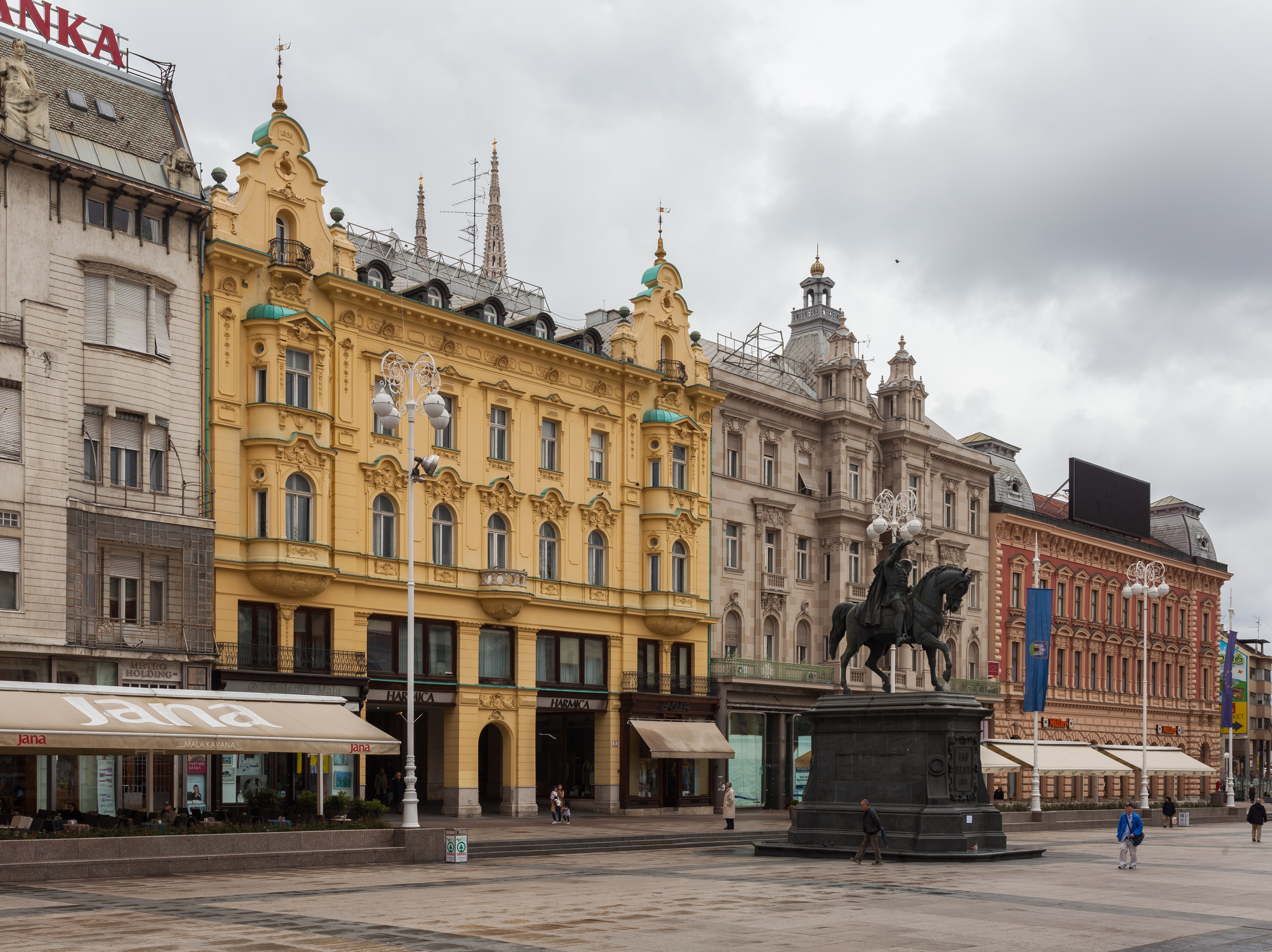
Façades of buildings in the north

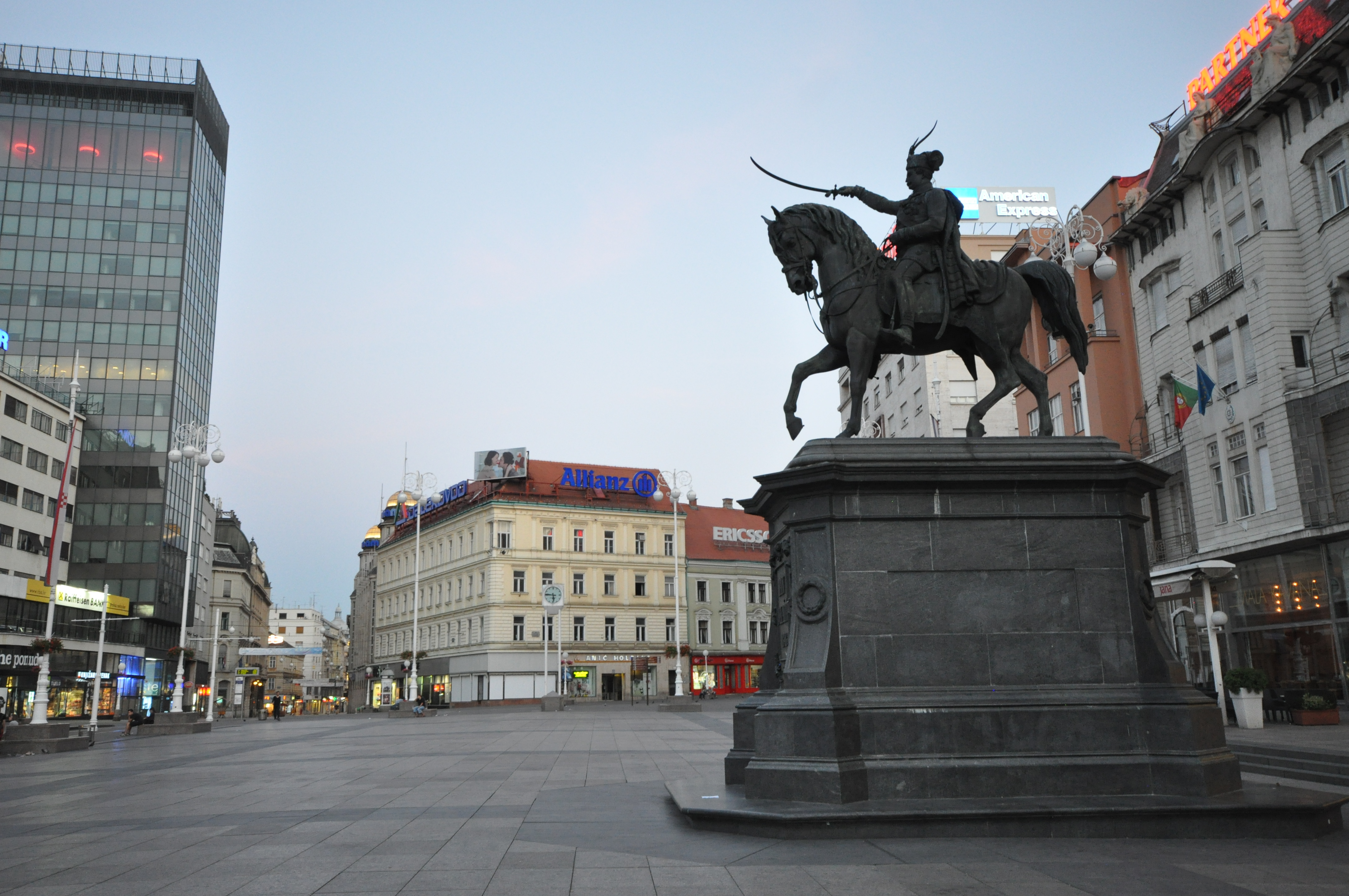
West view of Jelačić Square

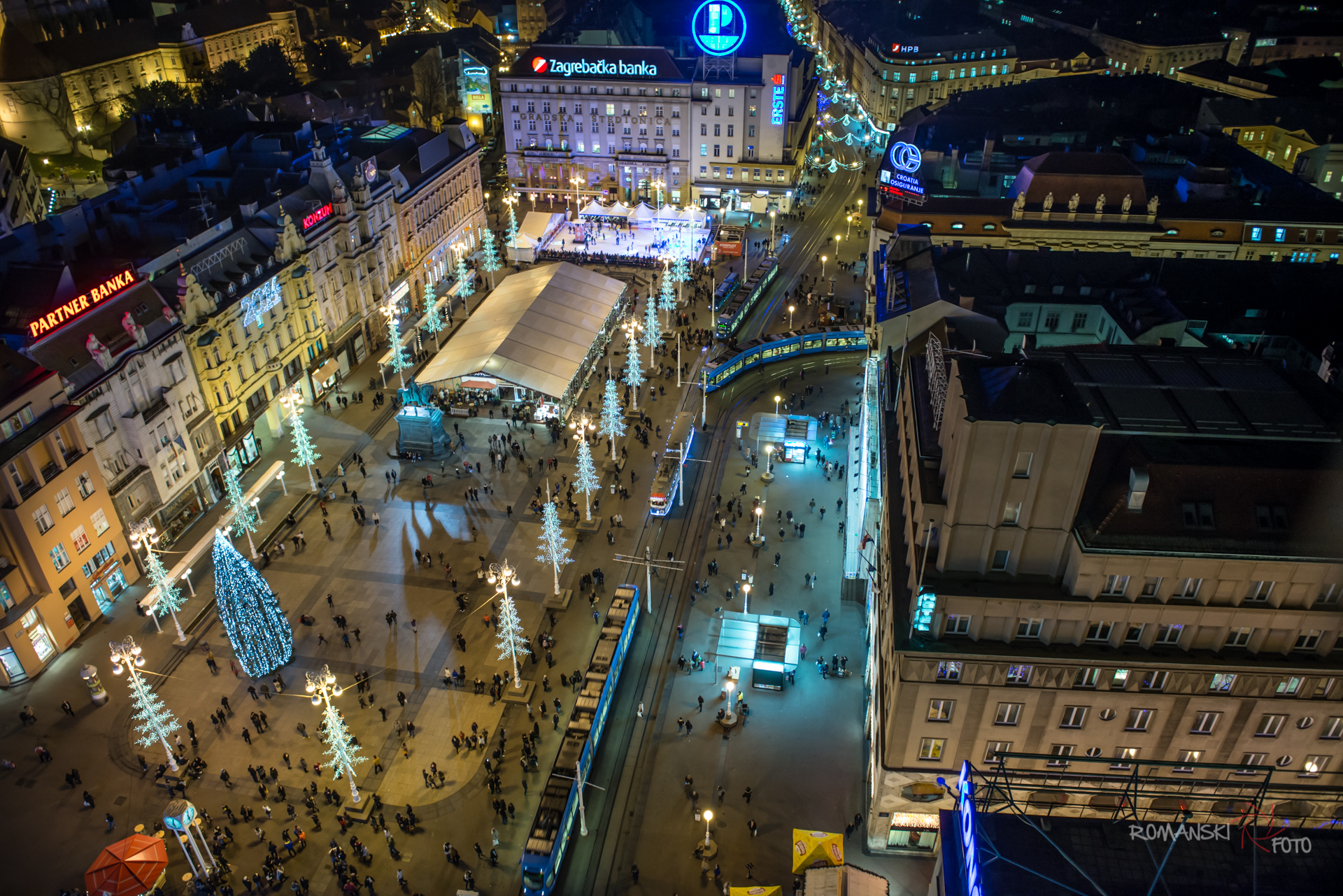
Christmas Market (Advent)

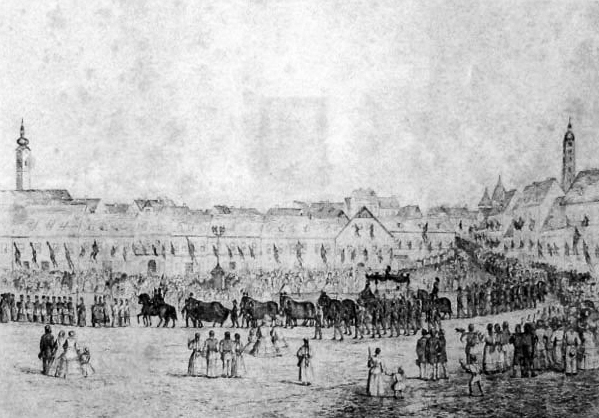
Funeral of Jelačić through square, 1859

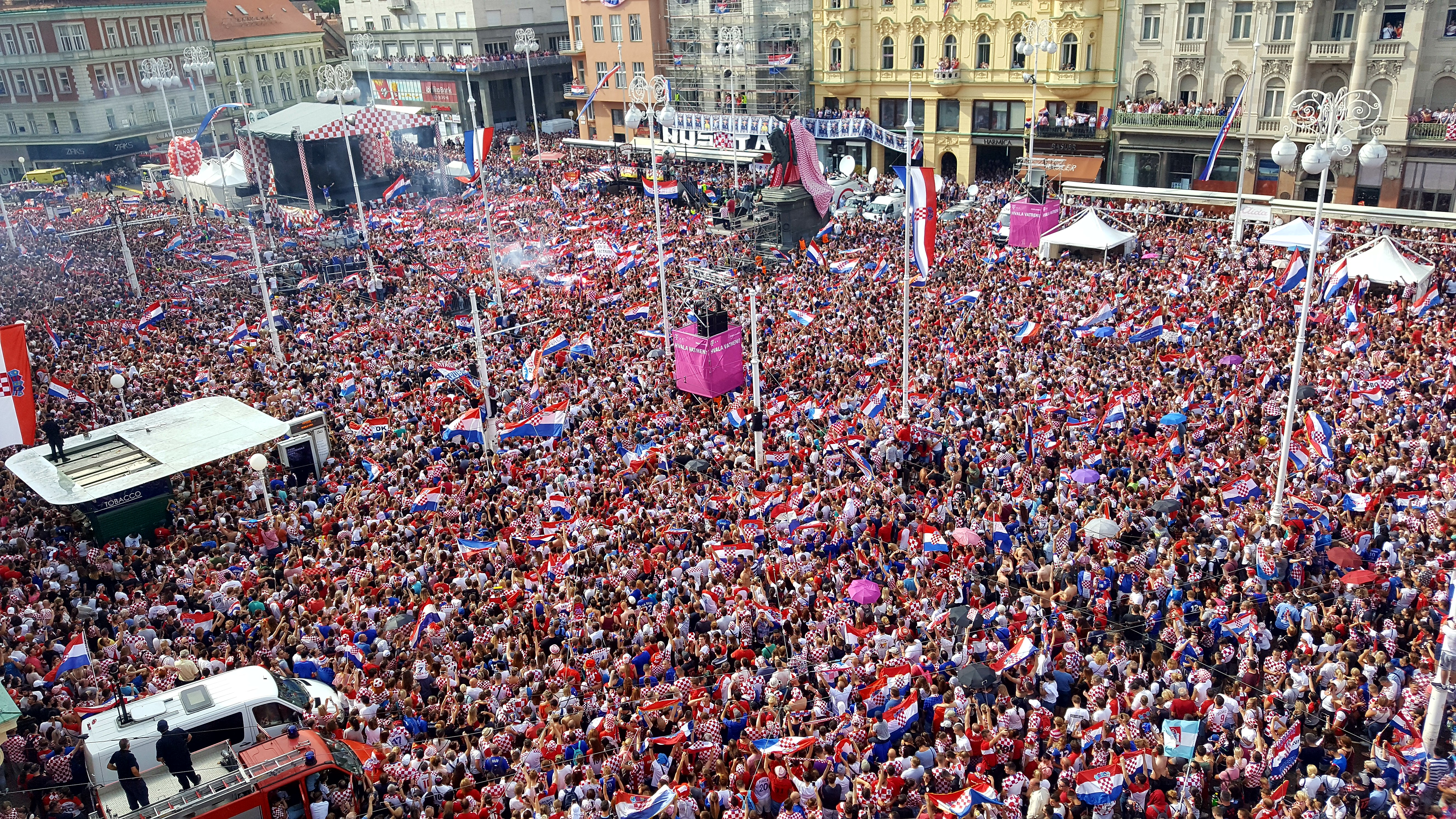
Fan celebrations at the square a day after 2018 FIFA World Cup Final, 16 July 2018

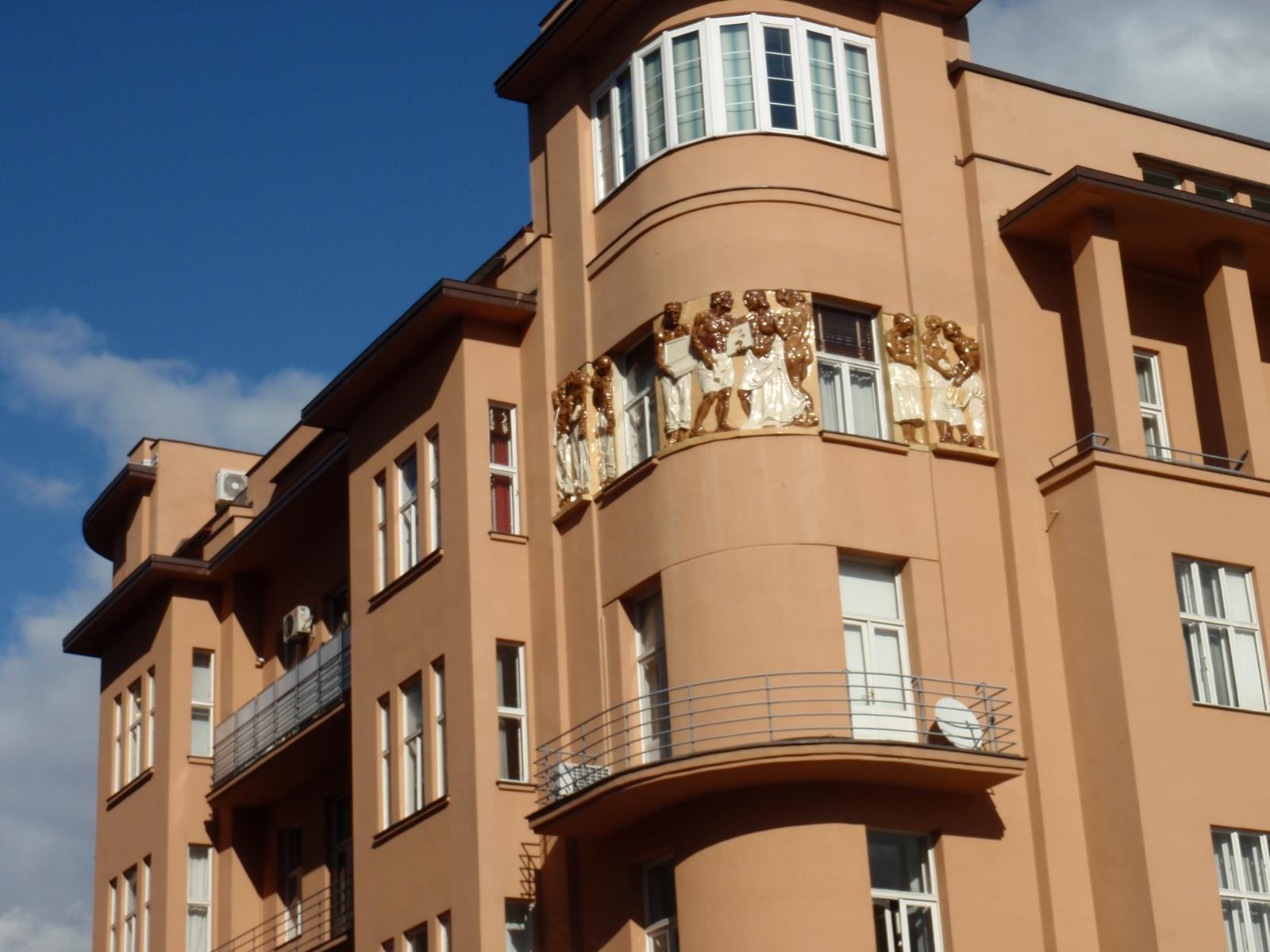
”Villagers” by Ivan Meštrović on the facade of one of the buildings on Square
