= Theodor Friedl =

Austrian sculptor (1842–1900)

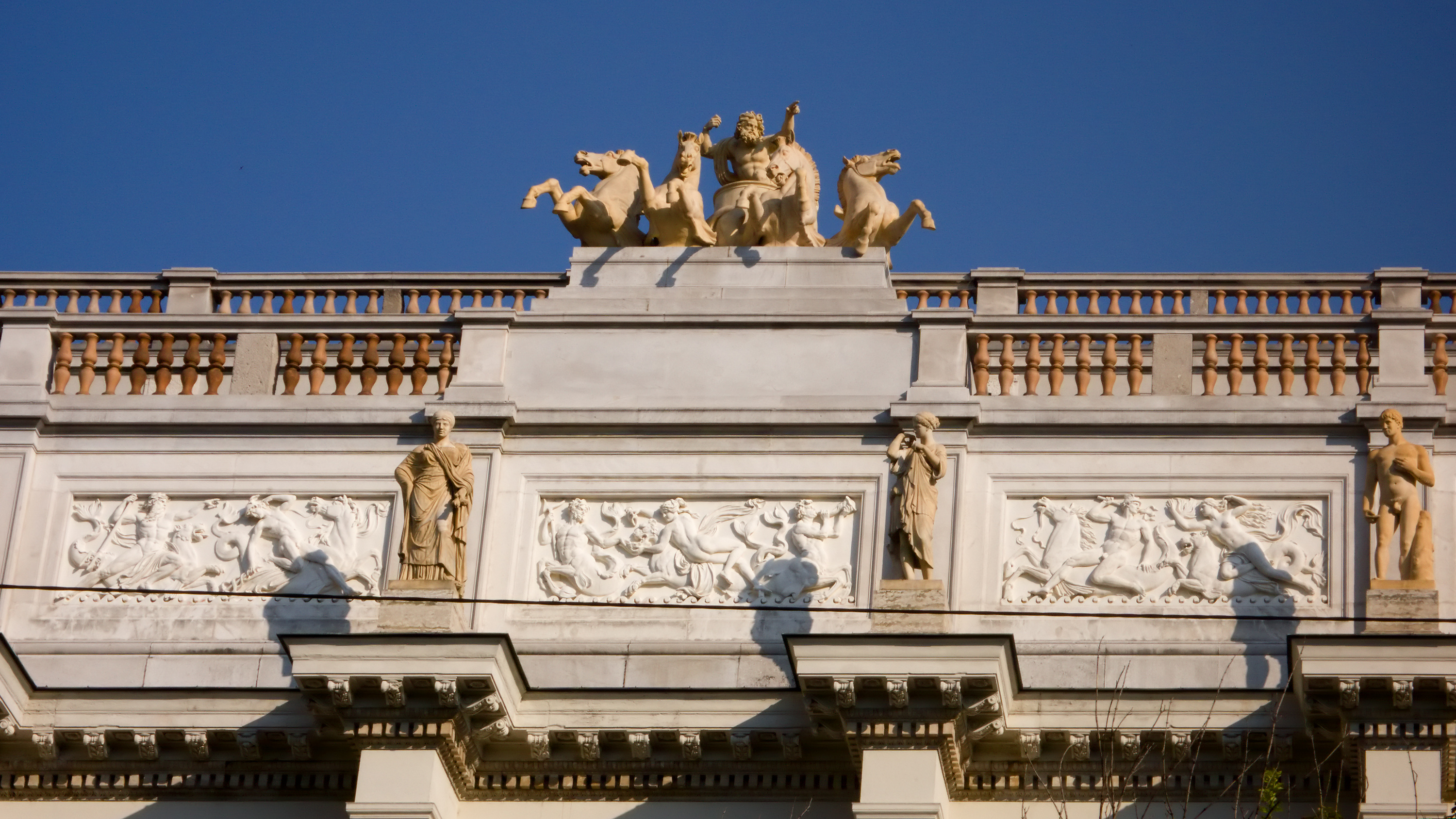
Quadriga, Vienna Stock Exchange, 1977

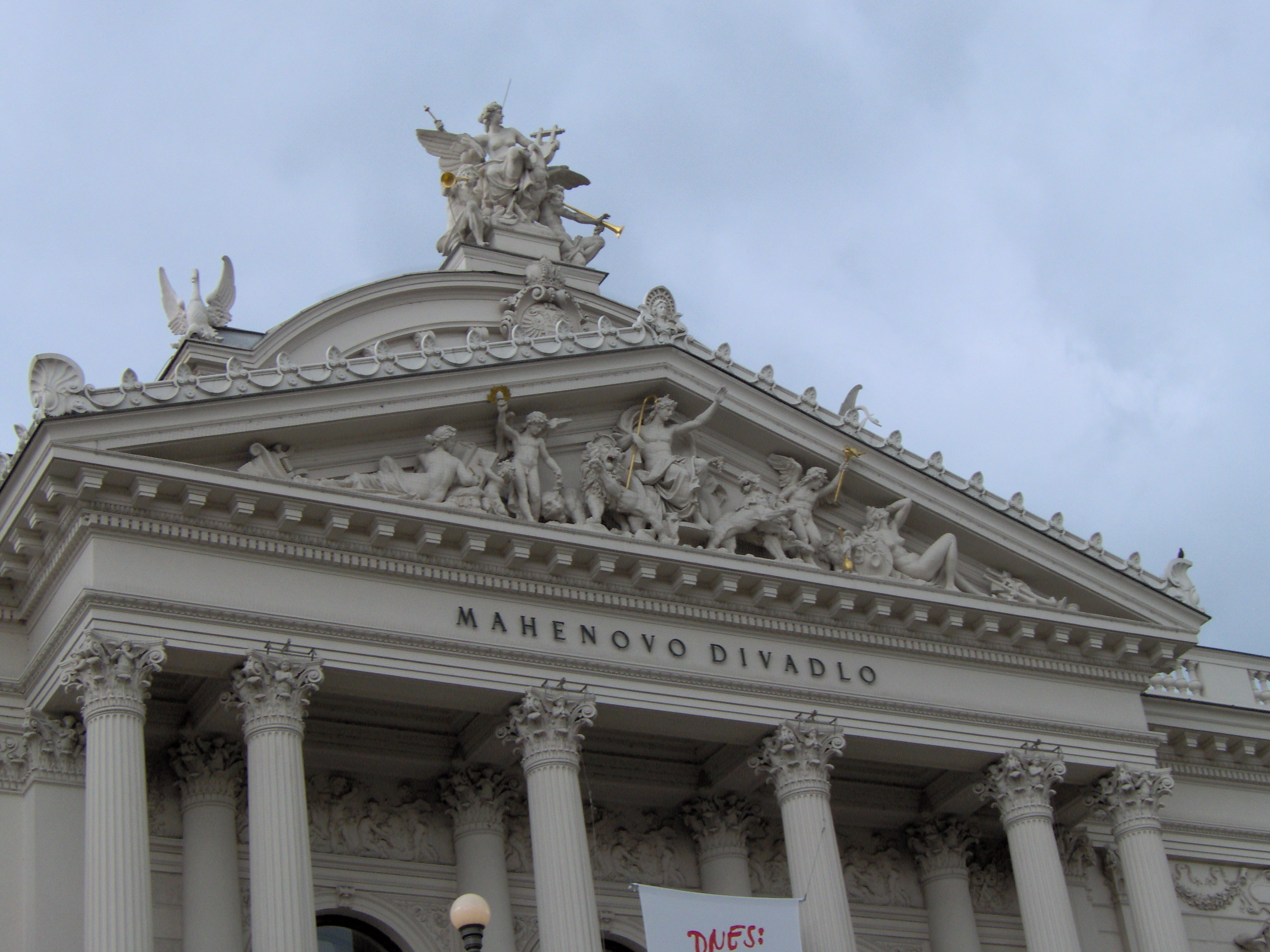
Friedl pediment sculpture at the Mahen Theatre, Brno

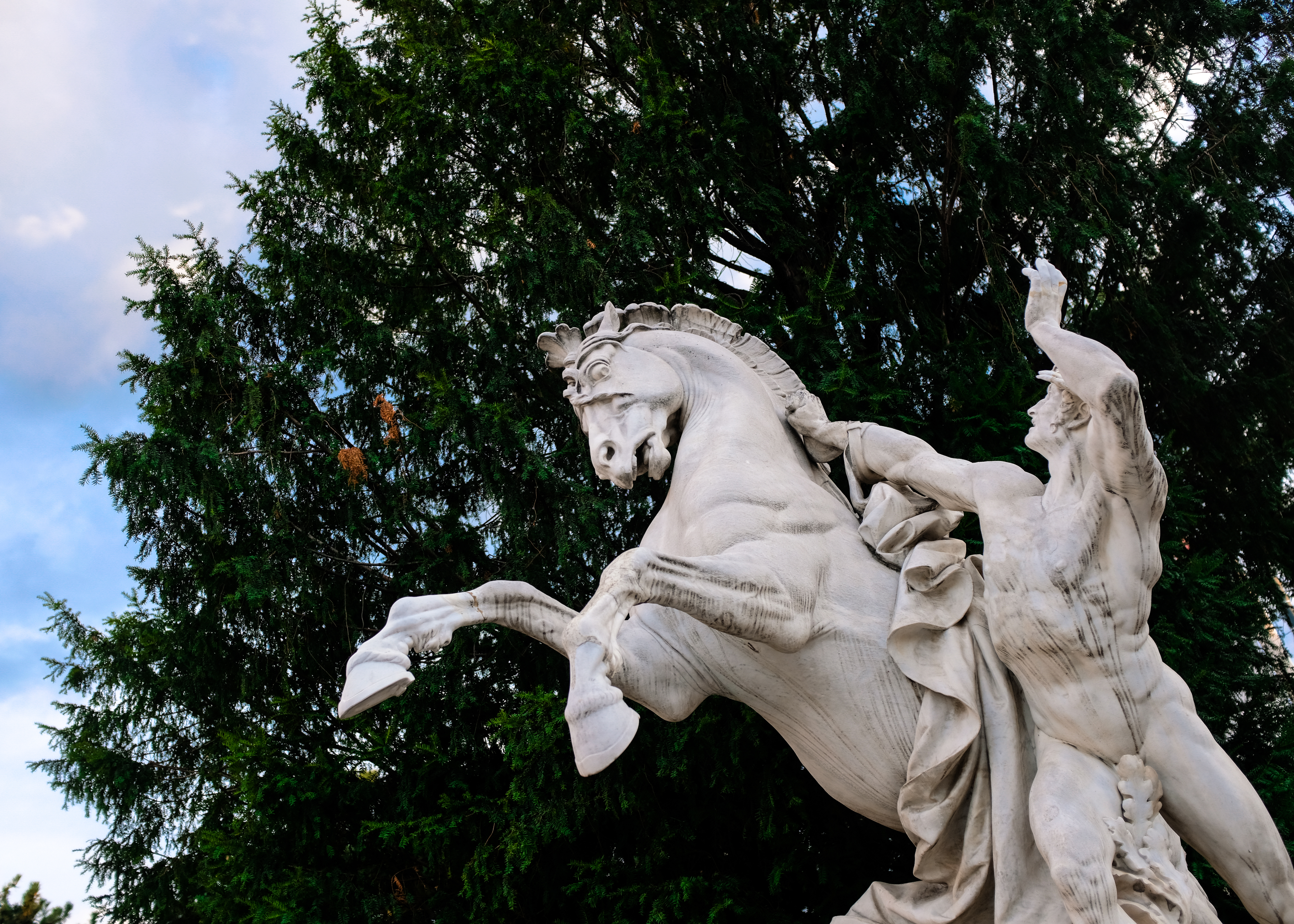
One of the Horse Tamer statues at Maria-Theresien-Platz

Theodor Friedl (13 February 1842 – 5 September 1900) was an Austrian sculptor.

== Biography ==
Friedl was born on 13 February 1842 in Vienna, Austrian Empire. He studied at the Academy of Fine Arts Vienna under Anton Dominik Fernkorn. Among his first major commissions was a program of architectural sculpture for the 1877 Vienna Stock Exchange, a collaboration with the Danish-Austrian Neoclassical architect Theophil Hansen. The program included a quadriga, six full-figure statues, and a series of frieze panels around the cornice line.

The same year Friedl had also begun a long-term working relationship with Viennese architects Fellner & Helmer for theaters across Europe, transmitting variations of the Viennese Neoclassical Ringstraße Style to Sofia, Brno, Berlin, etc.

Friedl died on 5 September 1900 in Warth, Austria-Hungary. He was buried with honors at the Vienna Central Cemetery, with a portrait relief on his tomb by sculptor Leopold Kosig.

== Work ==
Friedl's major work includes:

- Vienna Stock Exchange, for architect Theophil Hansen, 1877
- two finial Pegasus statues for the Stadttheater Augsburg, for Fellner & Helmer, 1877 (removed)
- Cupid and Psyche, marble, Belvedere, Vienna, 1882
- exterior and interior work at the Mahen Theatre, Brno, 1882, for Fellner & Helmer, 1882
- interior and exterior work, Municipal Theatre of Karlovy Vary, for Fellner & Helmer, 1886
- pediment sculpture and all other facade sculpture, State Opera, Prague, for Fellner & Helmer and other architects, 1888
- Komische Oper Berlin, for Fellner & Helmer, 1892
- freestanding Horse Tamer statue, Maria-Theresien-Platz, 1893
- reliefs on the Liberec City Hall, Liberec, for architect Franz Neumann, 1893
- ceiling reliefs in the Dutch Hall and Italian Hall, in the Palais Lanckoroński, Vienna, for Fellner & Helmer, 1895 (razed)
