= Franz Neumann =

Franz Neumann may refer to:

- Franz Neumann (architect), Austrian architect
- Franz Ernst Neumann, German physicist and mathematician
- Franz Leopold Neumann, German-American legal scholar and theorist
