= Liberec City Hall =

Building in Liberec, Czech Republic

Coordinates: 50°46′11″N 15°03′30″E

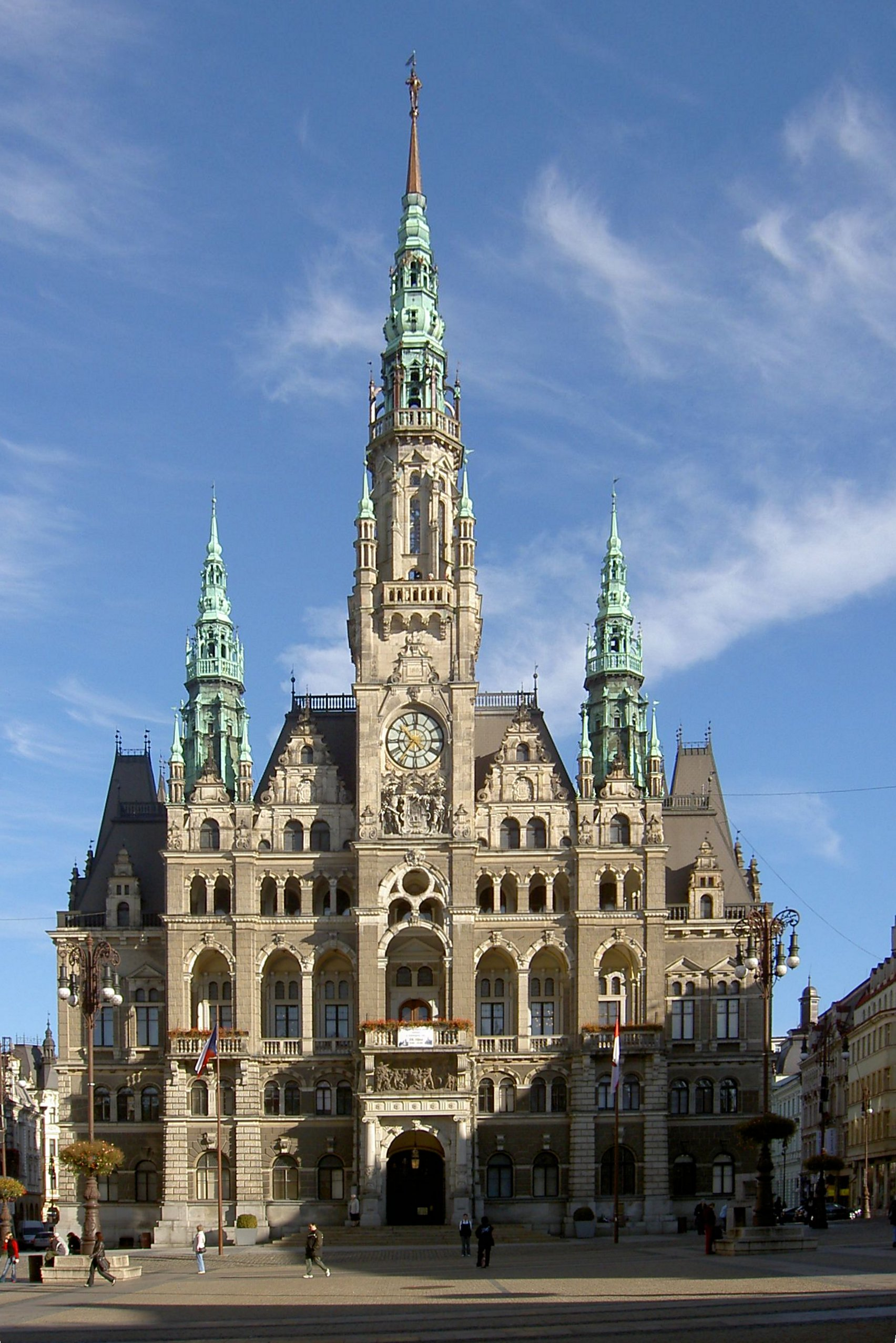
Front view

Liberec City Hall (Czech: Liberecká radnice) is a large building in Liberec in the Czech Republic.

== Location ==
The city hall is located in the historic city centre of Liberec (Liberec I-Staré Město district), on Dr. E. Beneše Square.

== History and architecture ==
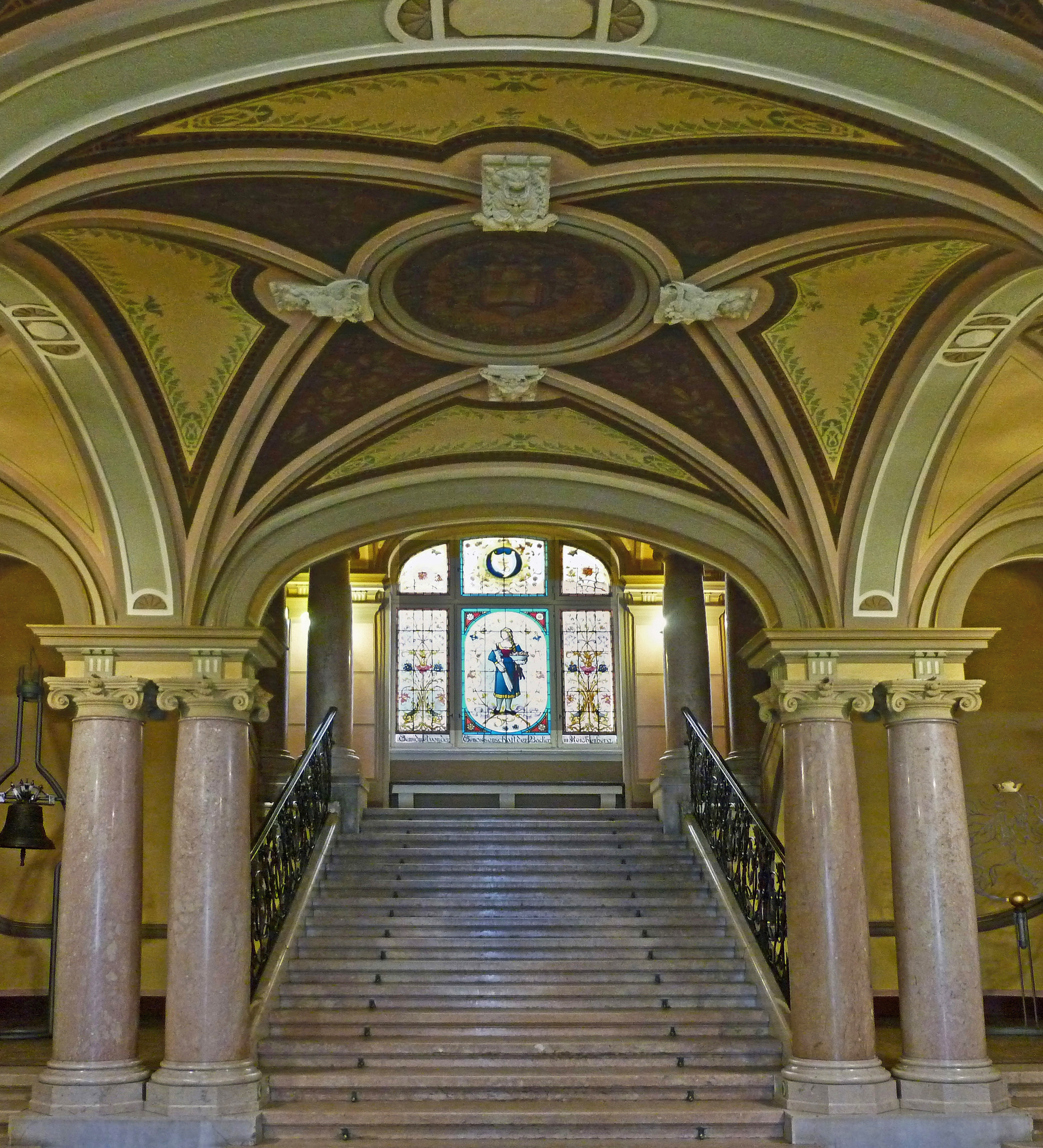
Interior of the city hall

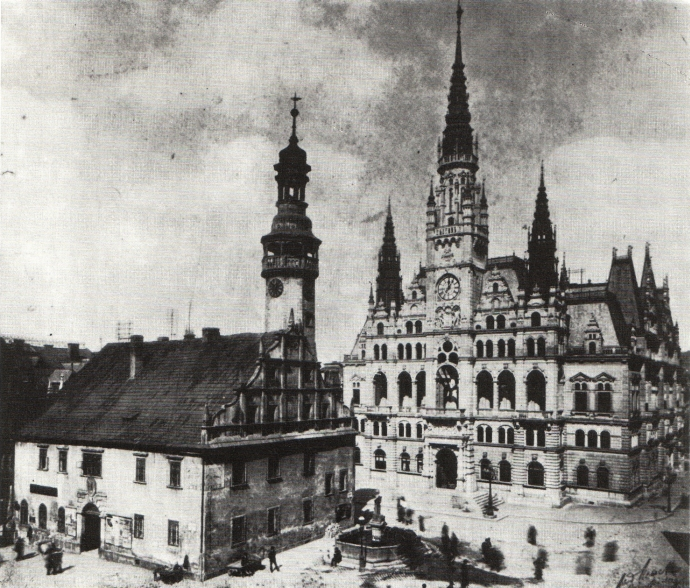
Old and new city hall next to each other in 1893

The city hall was built in the Neo-Renaissance style with elements of the transalpine Renaissance in 1888–1893. It was built according to the design by the Viennese architect Franz Neumann. It replaced an earlier structure, which was built in 1599–1603.

The building has three towers; the highest of them is 61 m (200 ft) high. The city hall is similar to the more famous Vienna City Hall. Its silhouette resembles a Gothic cathedral.

The building has a richly decorated façade, integrated artwork and rare stained glass windows. Above the entrance portal is a sculptural relief by Viennese sculptor Theodor Friedl, showing the establishment of the old and new city hall. At its centre is a female figure symbolizing the city; on the left side, figures associated with the original city hall, and figures associated with the emergence of a new city hall on the right, including the architect Neumann.

The front of the building is a bronze monument in the shape of a tank strip, commemorating nine victims of the invasion of the Warsaw Pact armies in August 1968.

From 1958, the city hall was protected as a cultural monument. Since 2024, it has been protected as a national cultural monument.

== Use ==
Since its inception, the city hall has served as the seat of the municipal authority.

In the summer season, the interiors and the highest tower are open to the public and are part of guided tours.
