= Hermannskogel =

Highest mountain in Vienna, Austria

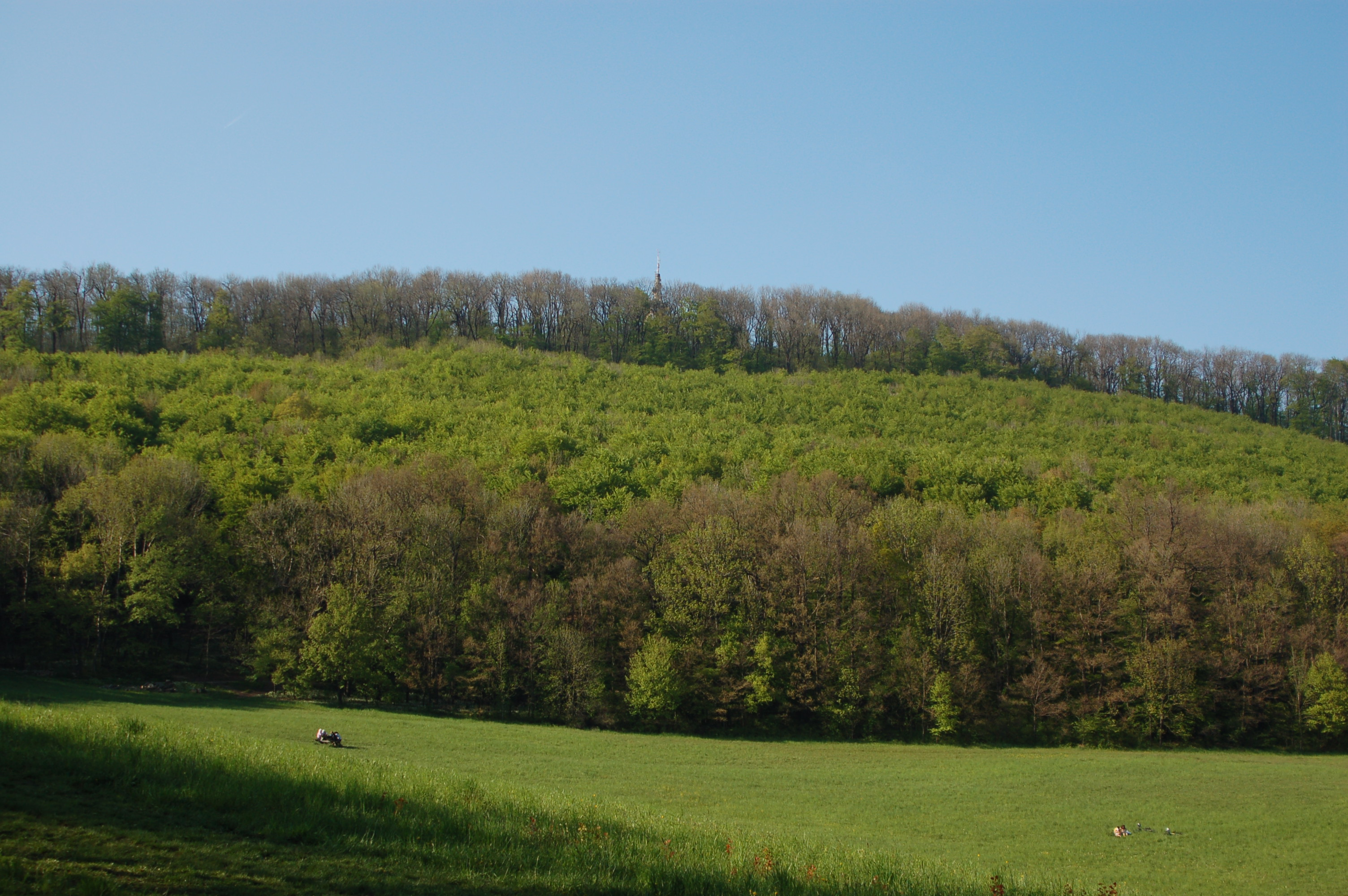
- Hermannskogel (and top of Habsburgwarte) seen from the Rohrerwiese

Highest point
- Elevation: 542 m (1,778 ft)
- Coordinates: 48°16′N 16°17′E

Geography
- Location within Austria
- Location: Vienna, Austria

The Hermannskogel (German pronunciation: [ˈhɛʁmansˌkoːɡl̩]) is a hill in Döbling, the 19th district of Vienna. At 542 metres above sea level, it is the highest natural point of Vienna. It lies on the border to Lower Austria.

The Habsburgwarte, standing atop the Hermannskogel, marked the kilometre zero in cartographic measurements used in Austria-Hungary until 1918.

== Geography ==
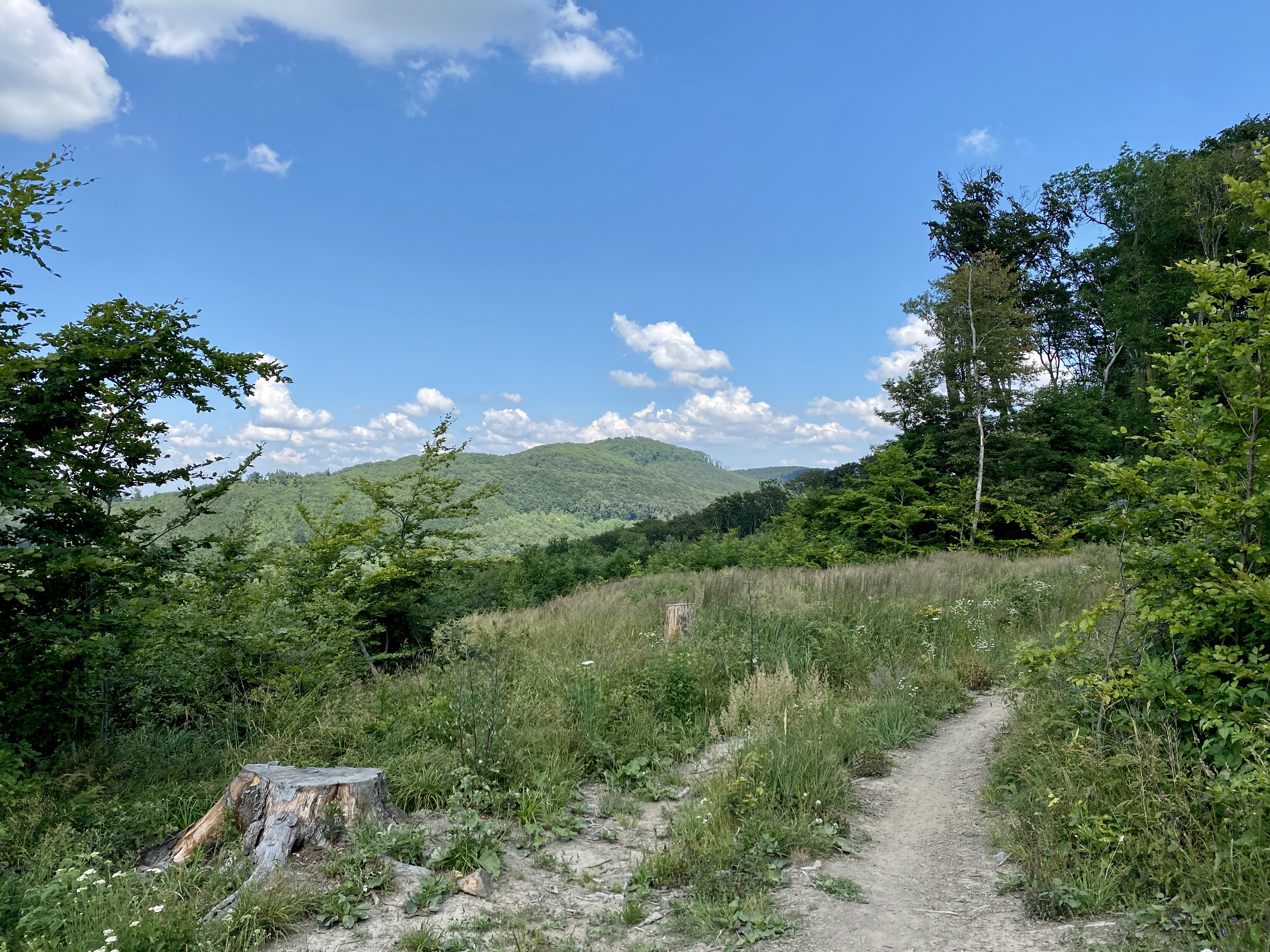
Hermannskogel seen from the southwest

The Hermannskogel is a forested ridge in the Wienerwald. It is both the highest point in the Kahlengebirge and in the city of Vienna. The Hermannskogel is part of a north-eastern chain of foothills belonging to the eastern Alps. It is composed of flysch containing quartz, limestone, marl, and other conglomerates. The many cliff-like layers on the south-western approach to the Hermannskogel clearly show the hill's geological make-up.

The Kahlenberg and Leopoldsberg, behind which lie the Wiener Pforte, where the Danube breaks through the Wienerwald, are three kilometres to the east of the Hermannskogel. The Vogelsangberg stands nearby, as does the Dreimarkstein (to the southwest).

== History ==
The first documentary reference to the Hermannskogel can be found in the Klosterneuburg Monastery’s tithe register. It dates from 1355 and names the hill hermannschobel. The name is composed of the personal name Hermann, which was common in the Middle Ages, and Kobel (which appears elsewhere as Kogel), a common designation for cone-shaped hills.

In the Middle Ages, the Hermannskogel was covered in vineyards. On the side of the hill, in a depression between Sievering and Weidling, is the probable former site of the village Kogelbrunn, which lived from viticulture and which is mentioned for the first time in a document from 1237 as chogelbrunne. In 1256, Albero von Feldsberg accorded the village to the Klosterneuburg Monastery. In 1346, it was still inhabited, but it was destroyed at the end of the 15th century, probably a victim of Magyar raids. The village's demise also spelt the end of the vineyards and the Hermannskogel was reclaimed by woods.

The relief army summoned from the Kingdom of Saxony and other parts of the empire that lifted the second siege of Vienna camped here in 1683.

In the 19th century, several requests made by the Klosterneuburg Monastery to erect a watchtower on the Hermannskogel were turned down. The 27-metre tall Habsburgwarte (known from 1938 to 1974 as the Hermannskogelwarte) was first built in 1888 and opened a year later.

== The kilometre zero ==
The Habsburgwarte that stands atop the Hermannskogel was established as the kilometre zero of cartographic measurements in Austria-Hungary at the start of the 19th century. In the 1920s however, Austria adopted the Gauss–Krüger coordinate system. Thereafter, the Hermannskogel had the same function as a trigonometric reference point as the Rauenberg point on the Marienhöhe in Berlin. The transition to the 1989 European Territorial Reference System will take place soon.
