= Habsburgwarte =

Coordinates: 48°16′12″N 16°17′37″E

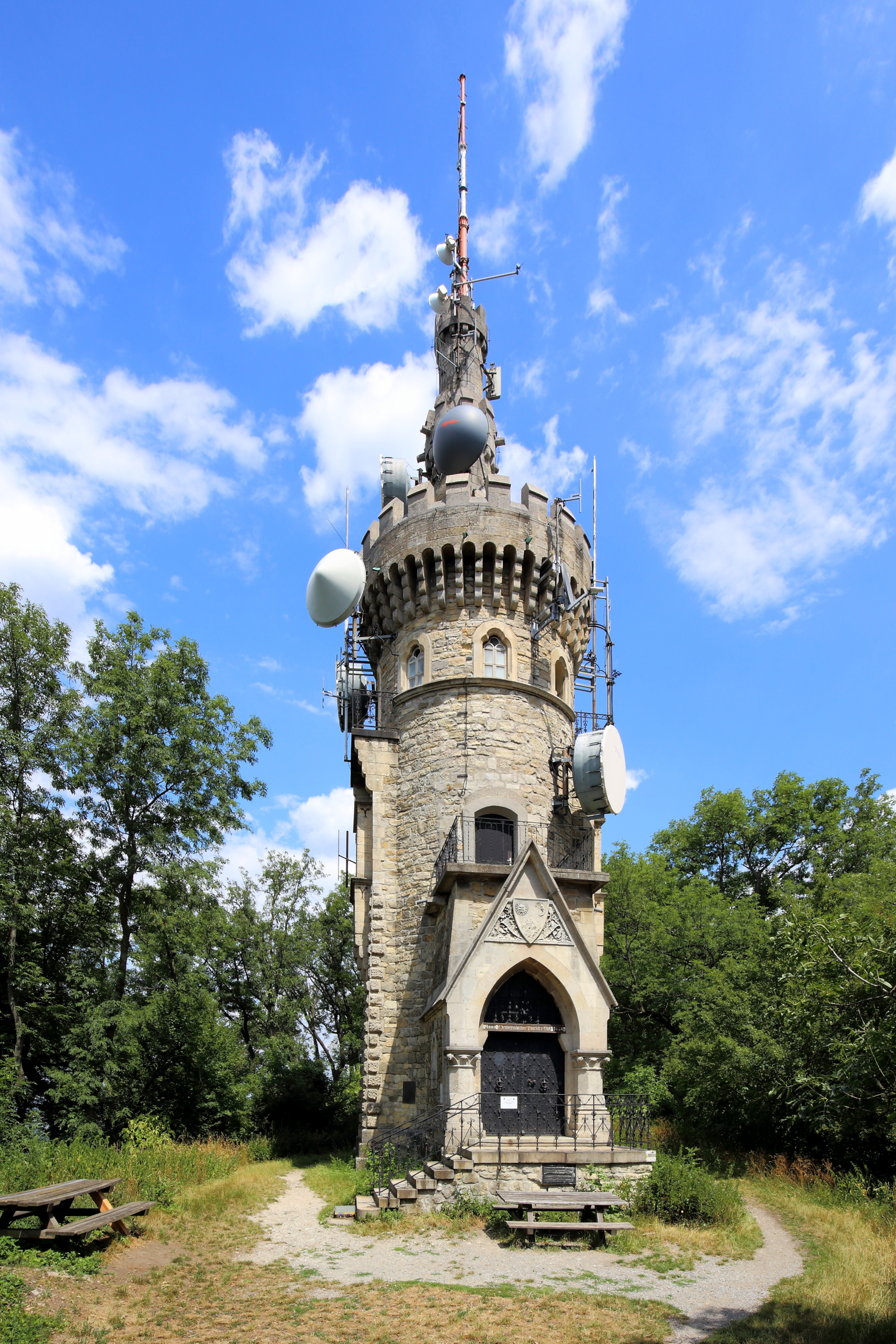
- Interactive map of the Habsburgwarte area

General information
- Location: Hermannskogel, Vienna, Austria
- Year built: 1888

Height
- Height: 27m

The Habsburgwarte is a 27-metre-tall tower on the Hermannskogel in Vienna, Austria. It was opened in 1889.

== History ==
In the 19th century, the Klosterneuburg Monastery, which owns the land on the Hermannskogel – Vienna’s highest elevation at 544 meters – sought to construct a permanent viewing tower but was denied permission. As an interim solution, a wooden observation structure was erected in 1877 under the care of the Austrian Tourist Club (Österreichischer Touristenklub, ÖTK). In 1883, the Club resolved to build a more durable stone tower. Construction permission was granted in 1887, and Emperor Franz Joseph I had previously approved the name "Habsburgwarte" in 1884.

The tower was constructed in 1888 to mark the 40th anniversary of Franz Joseph I’s reign. It was designed by architect Franz von Neumann Jr. in a Romanesque-Gothic revival style, reminiscent of a medieval watchtower. The Habsburgwarte was officially inaugurated on 6 October 1889.

In 1938, the National Socialists forced the tower to be renamed "Hermannskogelwarte". In 1945, the columned loggia on the first floor was destroyed by artillery fire. Restoration took place in 1947 with the support of NIOGAS (now EVN), which has used the tower as a relay station and remote monitoring site since 1960. On 13 September 1972, the Federal Monuments Office declared the Habsburgwarte a protected historic monument. On 8 October 1974, the Austrian Tourist Club (ÖTK) decided to revert to the original historical name, Habsburgwarte.

== Architecture ==
The neo-Romanesque-neo-Gothic structure, designed by architect Franz von Neumann Jr., consists of a 16-meter-high round tower topped by an 11-meter-high spire. On the observation platform, located 16.7 meters above the base, is the fundamental reference point of the Austrian national survey, established in 1892 by the Imperial and Royal Military Geographic Institute.

The original loggia on the first floor no longer exists. The Austrian Tourist Club continues to operate the Habsburgwarte as a public observation tower. It is open on weekends from spring to late autumn (approximately April to November) for a small entrance fee. Guided visits for registered groups are also available at other times by appointment.
