= Dolac Market =

Farmers' market in Zagreb, Croatia

- Tržnica Dolac
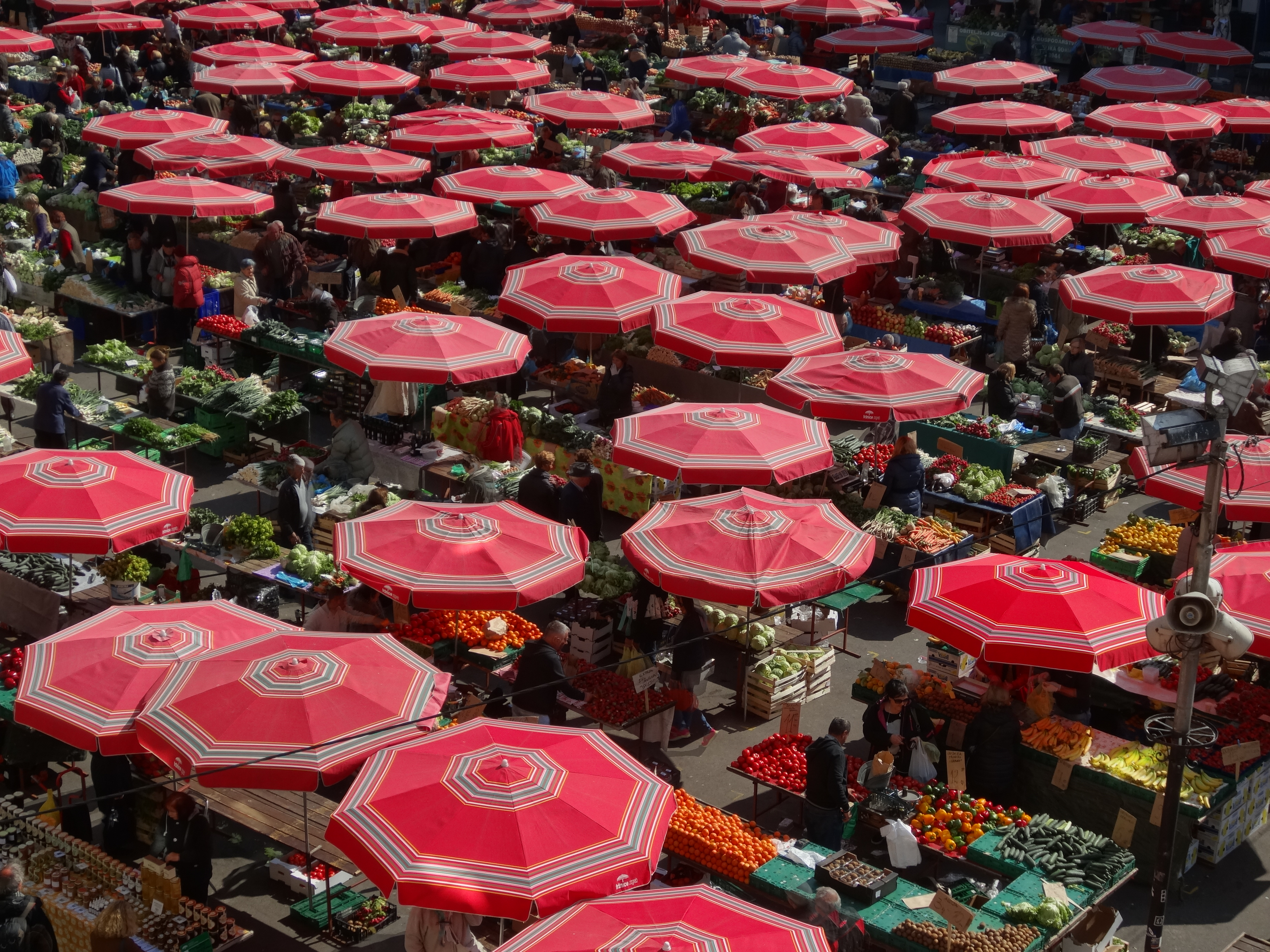
- Dolac Market
- Interactive map of Dolac Market
- Location: Zagreb, Croatia
- Coordinates: 45°48′47″N 15°58′38″E
- Type: Marketplace
- Beginning date: 1930; 96 years ago

Dolac (pronounced [dɔ̌lat͡s]) is a farmers' market located in Gornji Grad - Medveščak city district of Zagreb, Croatia. Dolac is the most visited and the best-known farmer's market in Zagreb, well known for its combination of traditional open market with iconic red umbrella stalls and a sheltered market below. It is located above Ban Jelačić Square, between the oldest parts of Zagreb, Gradec and Kaptol.

The daily market, on a raised square a set of stairs up from Jelačić, has been the city’s major trading place since 1930. Farmers from surrounding villages come to sell their home-made foodstuffs and very fresh fruit and vegetables. In the covered market downstairs are butchers, fishmongers and old ladies selling the local speciality sir i vrhnje (cheese and cream). Flowers and lace are also widely available. Alongside, the renovated fish market sells fresh produce every day but Monday.

== Sources ==
- Dolački vremeplov (in Croatian)
- Karlo Vajda i Vjekoslav Bastl: Izgradnja tržnice na Dolcu u Zagrebu, 1928.-1936. (in Croatian)
