= Franz von Neumann the Elder =

Austrian architect and politician (1815-1888)

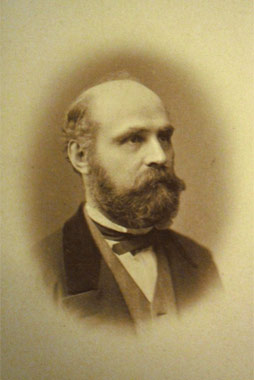
von Neumann in 1872

Franz von Neumann the Elder (21 March 1815 - 9 July 1888) was an Austrian architect and politician. He married Josefine Nitsche in 1843 and two of their sons - Franz the Younger and Gustav - also became architects.

== Life ==
He was born in Freudenthal, Austrian Silesia to master weaver Josef Neumann and his wife Johanna Zapf, though nothing is known about his education or when he moved to Vienna, where he became a draughtsman for master-builder Adolf Korompay. In 1837 he joined the Akademie der bildenden Künste Wien architecture course, but he left early two years later to become assistant to Karl Schleps, a court architect to the Dukes of Coburg. Schleps and Korompay were both then working on the Palais Coburg and Neumann also worked long years on that project, becoming a court architect for Coburg in 1847.

In 1861, Neumann became a member of the Association of Fine Artists of Vienna. From 1862 until his death, Neumann was a liberal representative in the Vienna City Council for the 8th district and was a member of important committees there. He was chairman of the construction section, deputy chairman of the Donaustadt Commission, and a member of the City Hall Construction and Water Supply Commission, alongside other posts.

In 1864, Neumann received the Cross of Merit of the Saxe-Ernestine House Order and was commissioned to carry out prestigious commissions in Gotha. He was commissioned to design the Ducal Museum Gotha in 1864 but was eventually dismissed in 1877 due to repeatedly exceeding the construction costs, though in 1876 he was still awarded the Knight's Cross 1st Class of the Saxe-Ernestine House Order. The dismissal did not damage his reputation in Vienna and in 1881 he was awarded the Order of the Iron Crown 3rd class and knighted. He died in Vienna and was buried in its Central Cemetery.

== Works ==
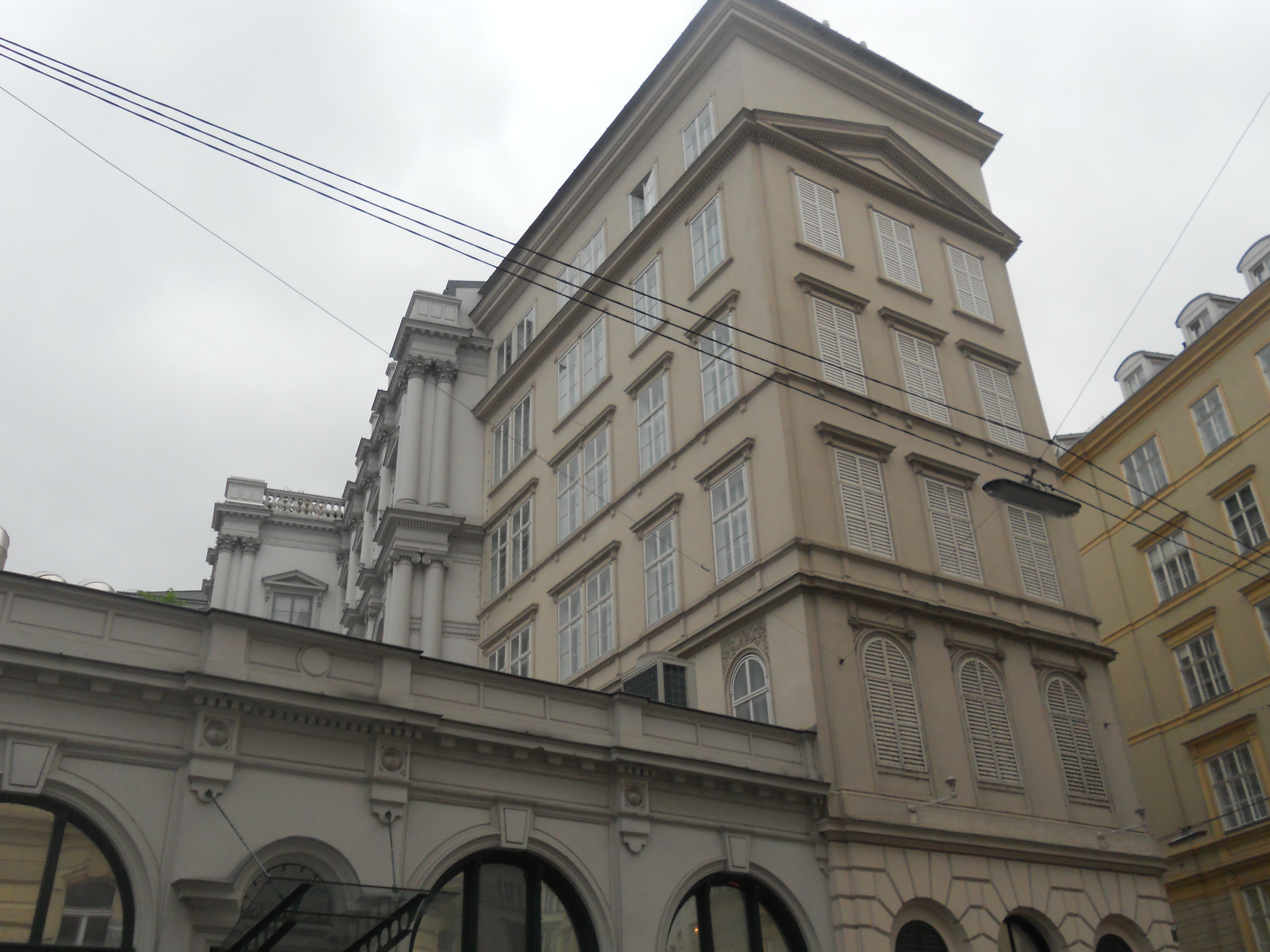
Seilerstätte 1 (1849)

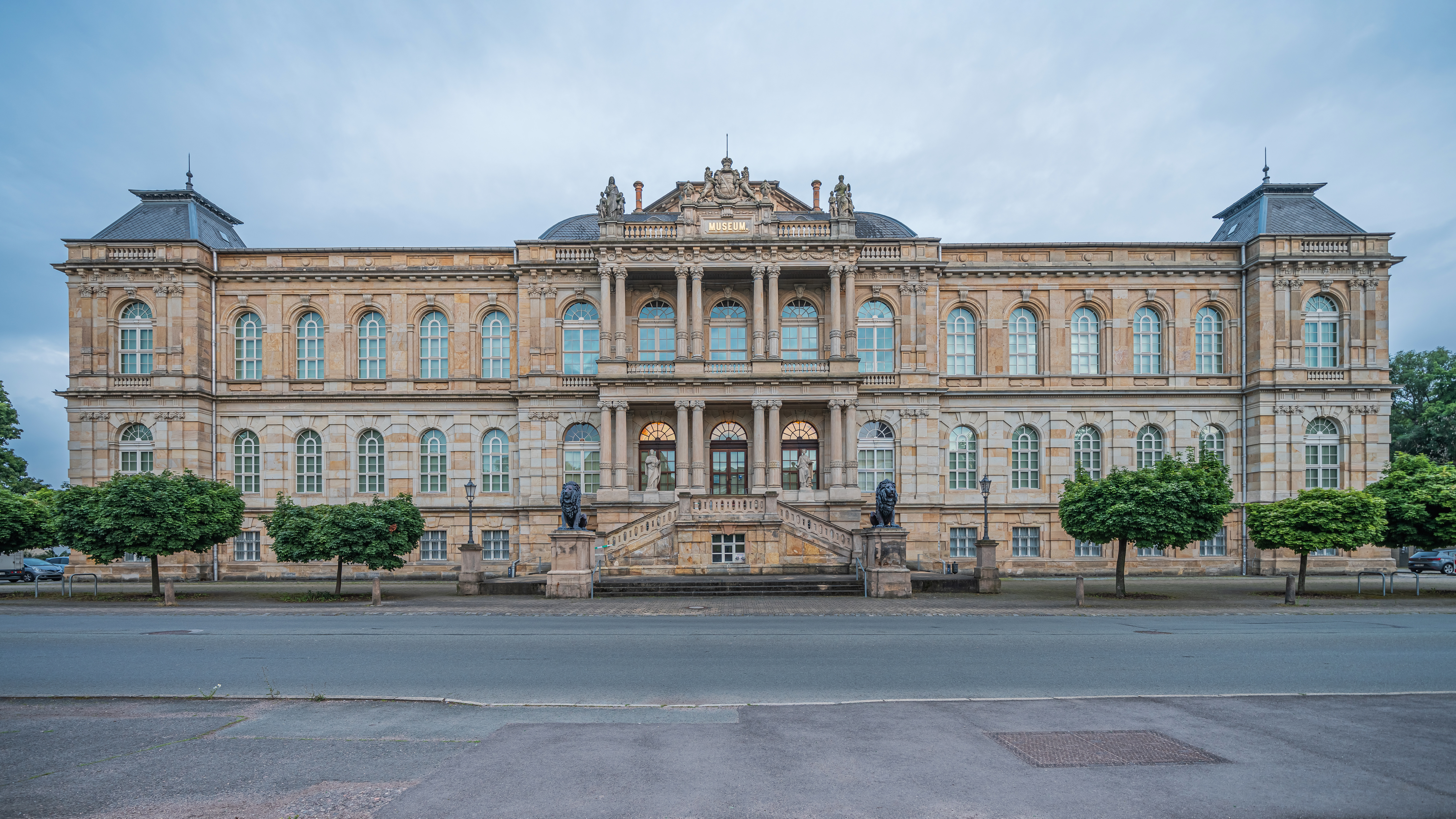
Ducal Museum, Gotha (1864–1877)

== Bibliography ==
- Constantin von Wurzbach: "Neumann, Franz (Architekt)." In: Biographisches Lexikon des Kaiserthums Oesterreich (Biographical Lexicon of the Empire of Austria). Part 20 Kaiserlich-königliche Hof- und Staatsdruckerei, Vienna 1869, p. 289 (digitalised).
- Helmut Roob, Günter Scheffler: Neumann, Franz Ritter von (d.Ä.). In: Dies.: Gothaer Persönlichkeiten. Taschenlexikon. 2. Auflage. RhinoVerlag, Ilmenau 2006, ISBN 3-932081-37-4, S. 94.
