= Harmica =

Harmica may refer to:

- Harmica, Zagreb County, a settlement in Croatia, on the border with Slovenia
- Harmica, Zagreb, a street connecting to the main square of Zagreb, Croatia, and one of its historical names
