= Anton Dominik Fernkorn =

German-Austrian sculptor

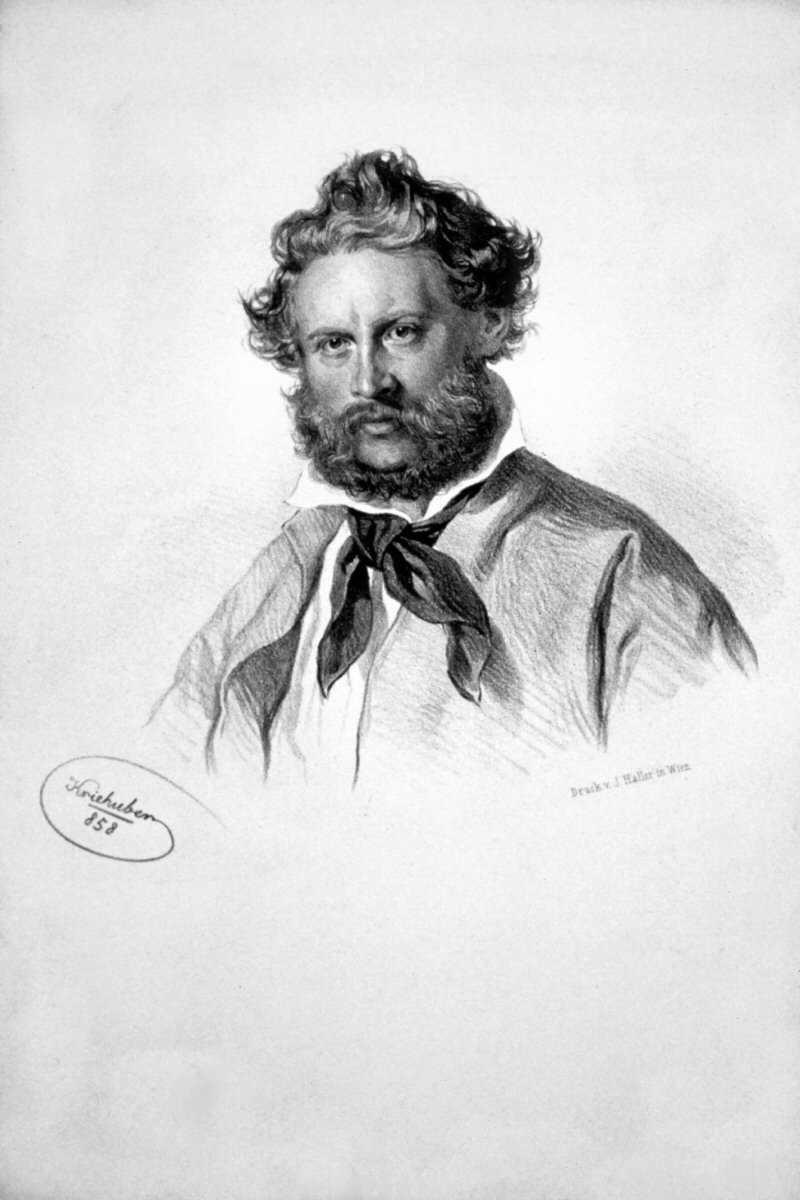
Anton Dominik Fernkorn

Anton Dominik Ritter von Fernkorn (March 17, 1813 in Erfurt – November 16, 1878 in Vienna) was a German-Austrian sculptor.

== Career ==
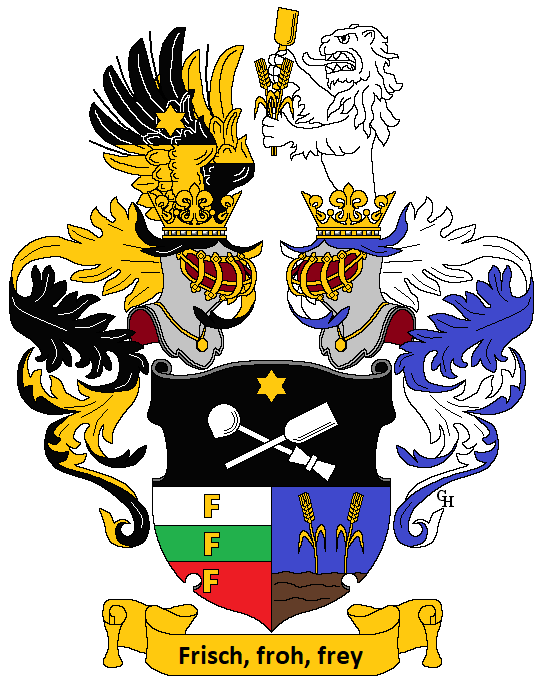
Fernkorn's arms as Ritter, 1860

Fernkorn studied sculpture under the sculptors Johann Baptist Stiglmaier and Ludwig Michael Schwanthaler in Munich, 1836–40. His first sculptural project, “Saint George and the Dragon” for the courtyard of the Montenuovo palace, attracted attention, and the Austrian government appointed him director of the imperial bronze foundry at Vienna, in 1840, where he was part of the rebellion against the Neo-Classicism of that time and place. For the Cathedral of Speyer, in 1858 he completed six of the eight free-stone statues of the German emperors buried there.

He rediscovered Baroque sculpture and used it as the basis for his equestrian statue of Archduke Charles (1859), who had defeated Napoleon at the Battle of Aspern in 1809. In this work Fernkorn skillfully executed the difficult task of creating a monumentally sized equestrian statue with the horse (and rider) successfully balanced on the horse's two rear legs.

His equestrian monument of Prince Eugene of Savoy is less successful and by the time of its unveiling in 1865, Fernkorn's mental illness made it impossible for him to produce any more work.

Fernkorn is well remembered for his portraits, and these include a bust of the Emperor Franz Joseph I of Austria and the funerary bust of Carl Ludwig Freiherr von Bruck (1862). He was also a noted animalier, producing works such as the Lion of Aspern in Vienna.

His statue of ban Josip Jelačić stands at the central Zagreb square, named after Jelačić. The square features a large equestrian statue of Count Jelačić, created by Fernkorn. The statue was originally installed on 19 October 1866 by the Austrian authorities, despite protest from the Zagreb councilmen. It was oriented towards the north at the time. The statue was removed in 1947, as the new Communist government of Yugoslavia denounced Jelačić as an Austrian collaborator. In 1990, the statue was reinstated after Croatia regained independence and Jelačić's historic role was reevaluated. The reinstated statue faces south.

Fernkorn created the oldest representative public monument in Ljubljana, a bust of the field marshal Joseph Radetzky. It was almost two meters high and made of bronze. The field marshal was depicted highly realistically in his suit with decorations and a laurel wreath as a symbol of victory and glory. The statue was meant to reflect the loyalty to the Habsburg crown and was the place of all events on a high level in Ljubljana, but also the meeting place for drunk citizens at night. The statue was removed by "patriots" in the night of 30 December 1918, after the collapse of the Austria-Hungary and the end of World War I, and later placed in the National Museum. In 1864, he also created four iron cast dogs, still on display in Tivoli Park in Ljubljana. As the dogs don't have tongues, it has been falsely rumoured that Fernkorn committed suicide by shooting himself due to this mistake.

Fernkorn's own cemetery monument, created by the sculptor Josef Beyer, is located in the Zentralfriedhof (Central Cemetery) in Vienna. It consists of a relief of the artist, dressed for work and holding the tools of his trade, surrounded by shallow reliefs of some of his better known works, including his equestrian monuments to the Archduke Charles and Prince Eugene and the Lion of Aspern.

Among his students was Theodor Friedl.

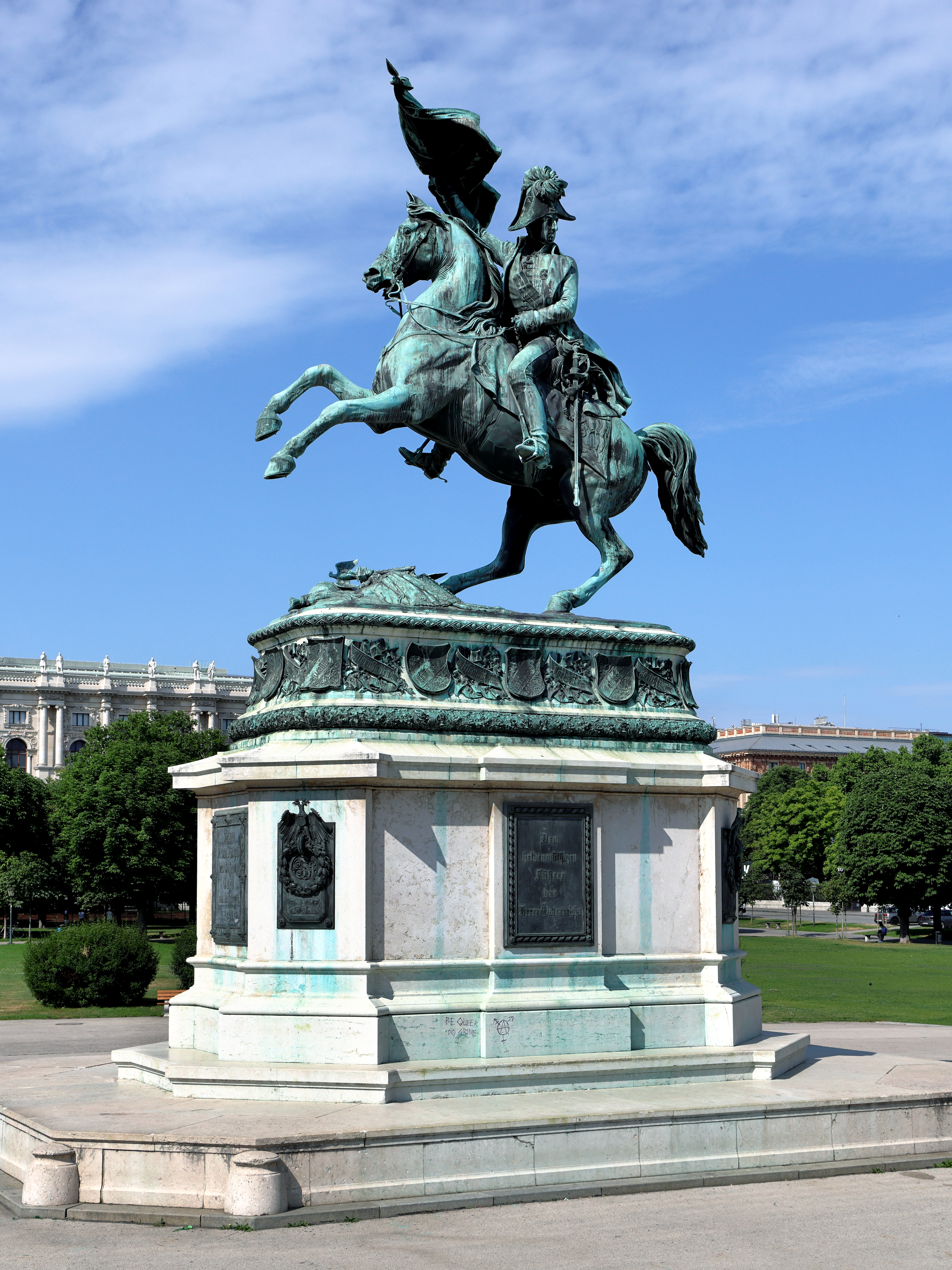
Archduke Charles, Vienna, Austria

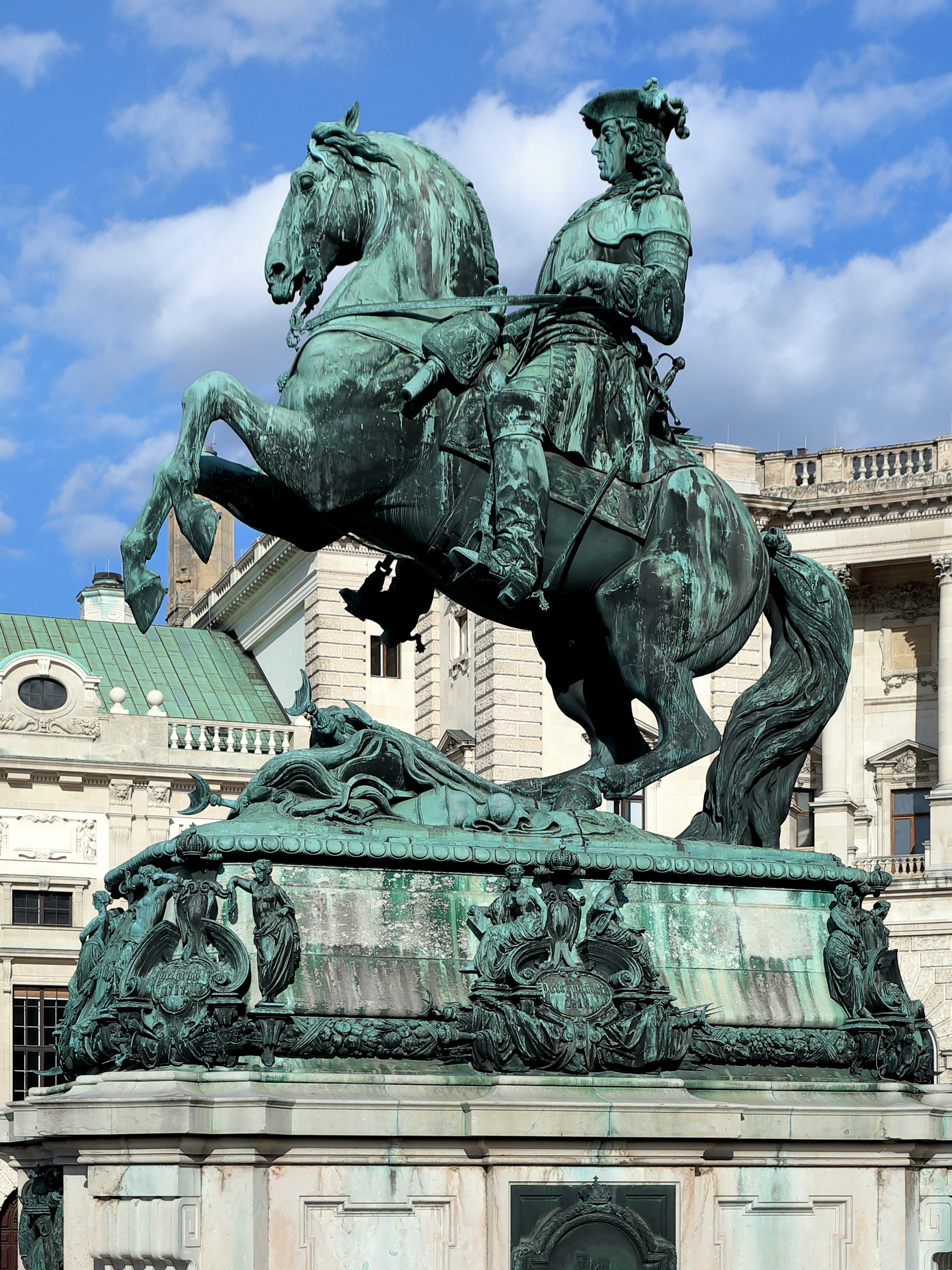
Prince Eugene Monument on Heldenplatz in Vienna

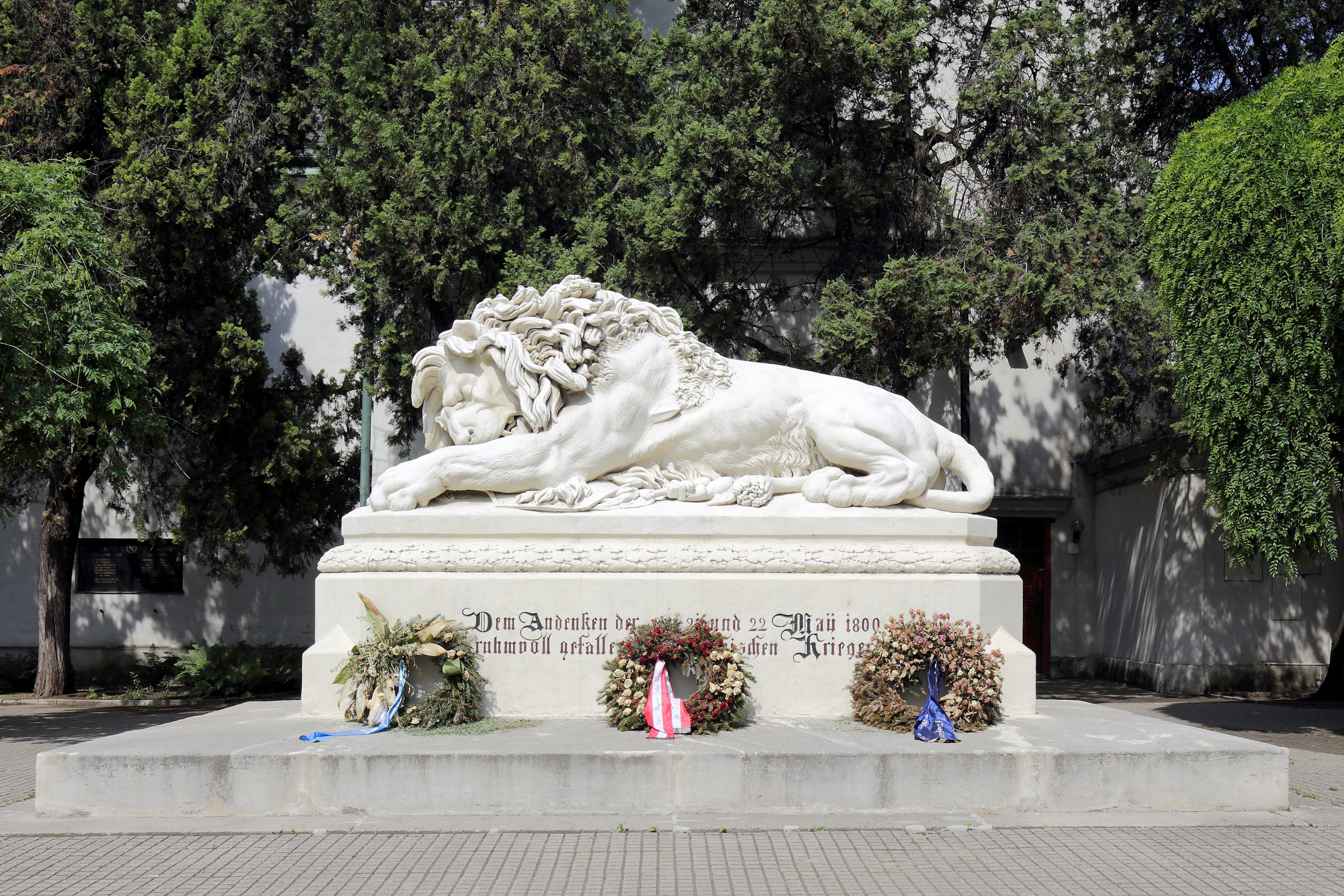
The Lion of Aspern (Details)

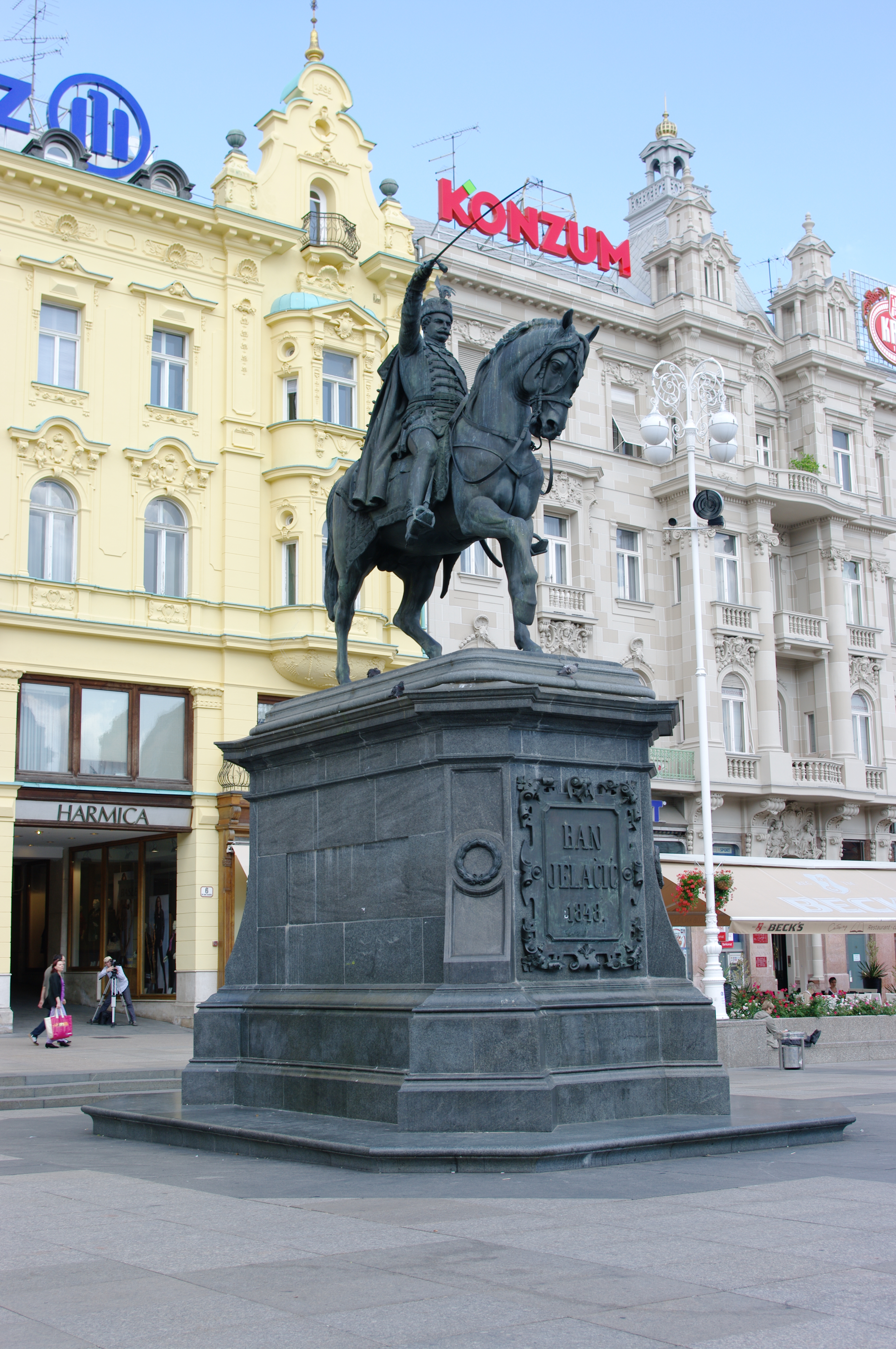
Statue of ban Josip Jelačić in Zagreb

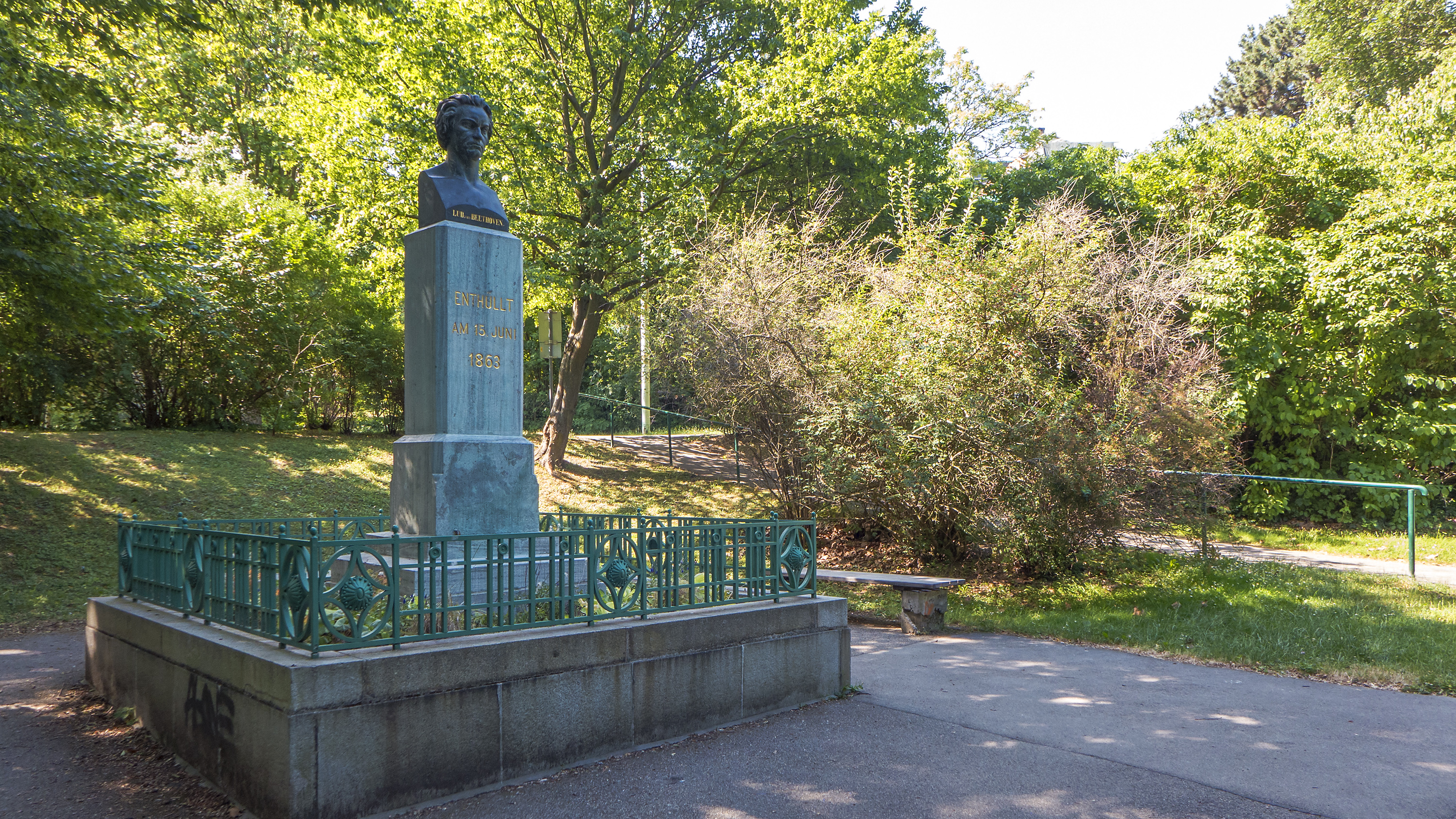
Bust of Beethoven on a stone column (15/23 June 1863), Vienna, Austria

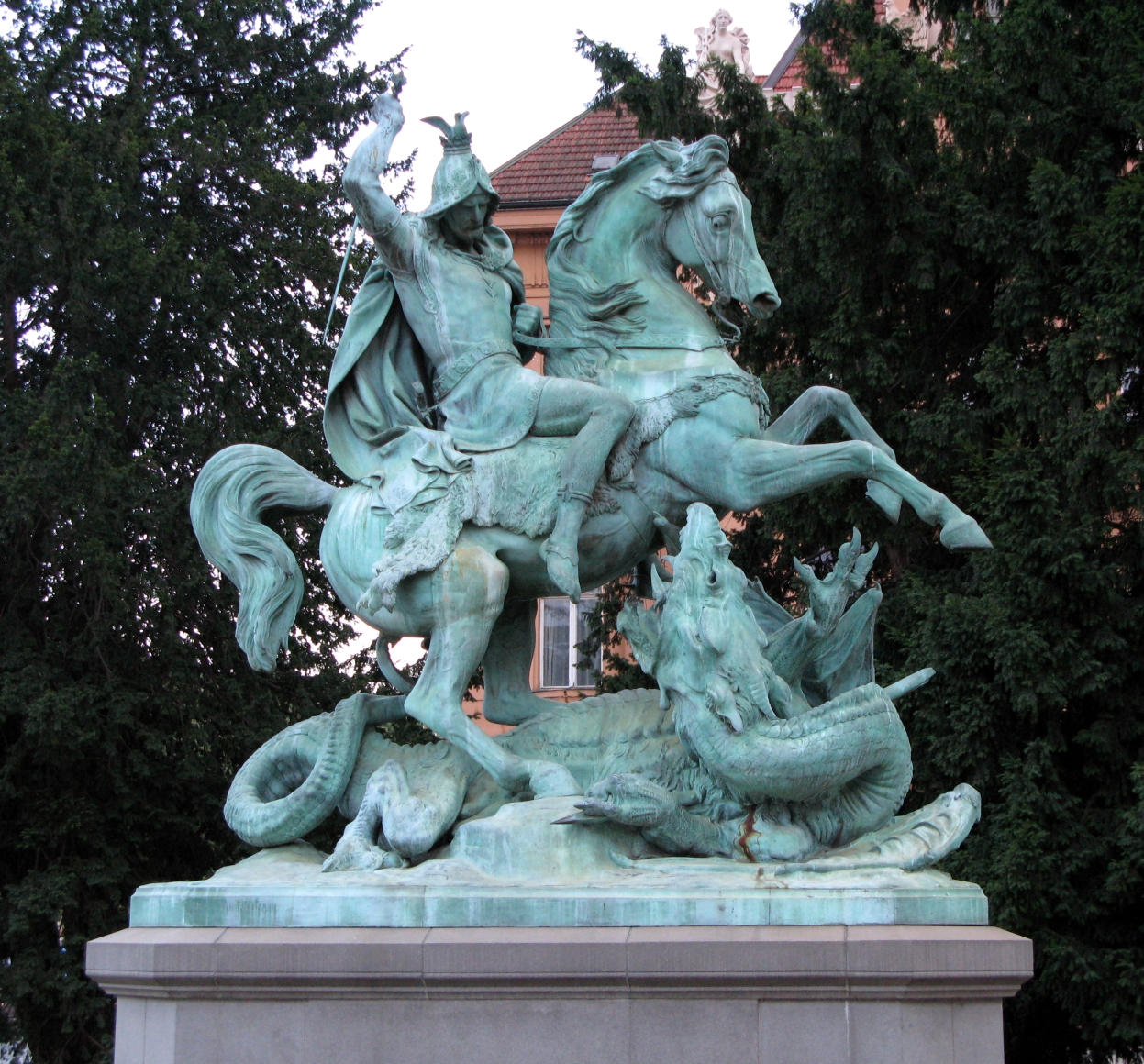
Saint George killing a dragon, statue in Zagreb
