= Franz Neumann (architect) =

Austrian architect and politician (1844–1905)

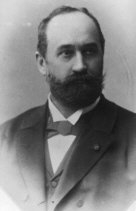
Franz Neumann

Franz Ritter von Neumann the Younger (January 16, 1844, Vienna – February 1, 1905, Vienna) was an Austrian architect.

== Biography ==
Neumann came from a family of notable architects: his father Franz Neumann (1815–1888) and his brother Gustav von Neumann (1856–1928) were both well known in Vienna. He began his career as an apprentice to Eduard van der Nüll and August Sicard von Sicardsburg, then joined the staff of Friedrich von Schmidt.

Neumann's major work includes (in Vienna unless otherwise noted):

- Kuffner Observatory, 1886
- Liebenberg Memorial, 1887
- Habsburgwarte, 1889
- Liberec City Hall, 1893
- Frýdlant Town Hall, 1893
- St. Leopold's Church, Donaufeld, 1914
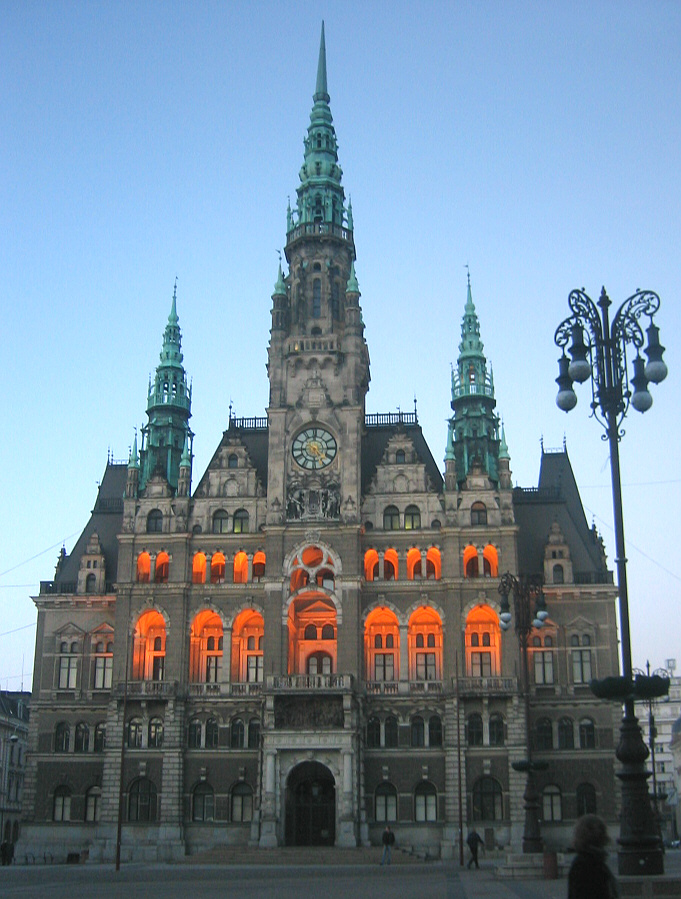
Liberec Town Hall (1892)

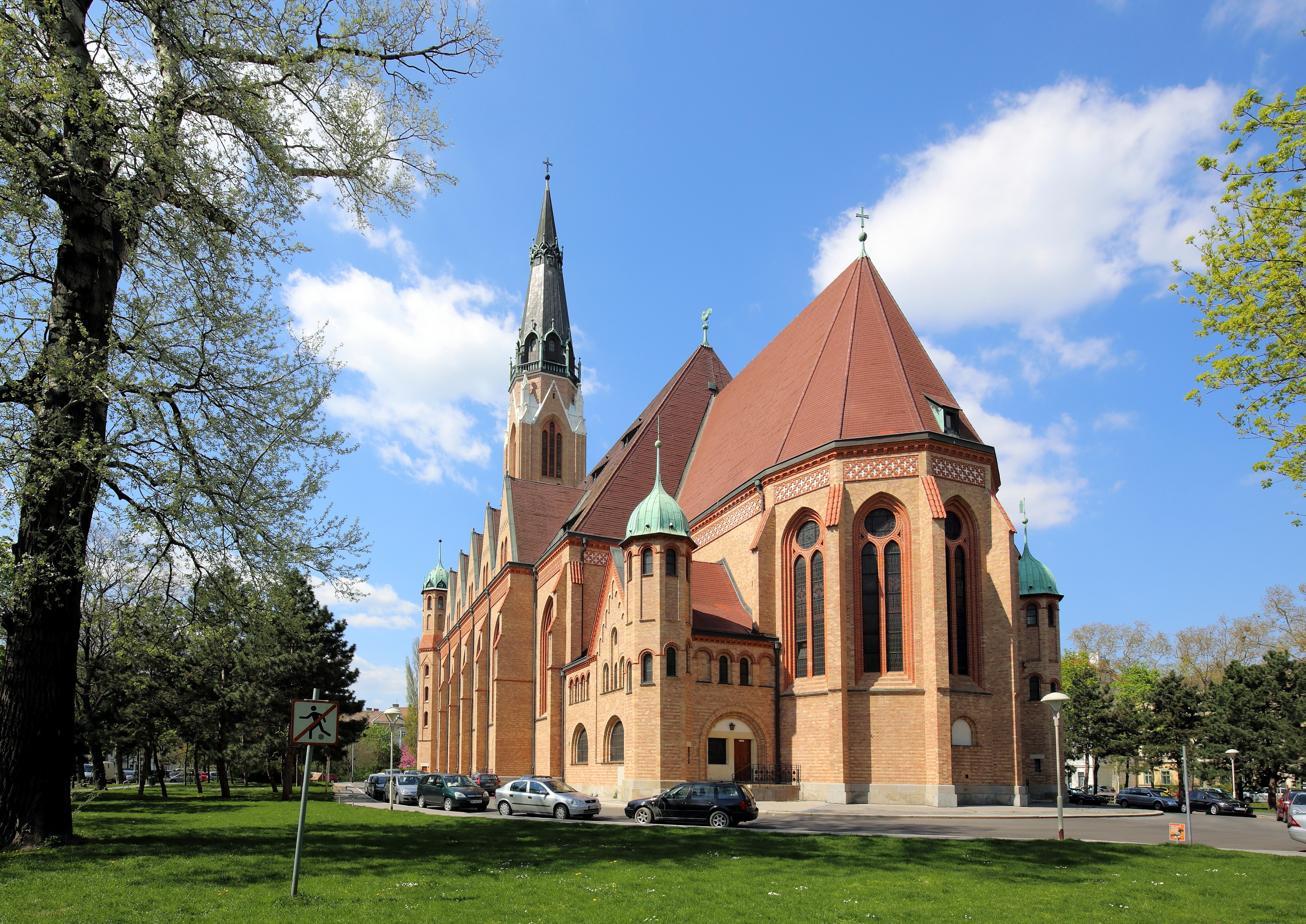
Donaufelder Pfarrkirche (1905)

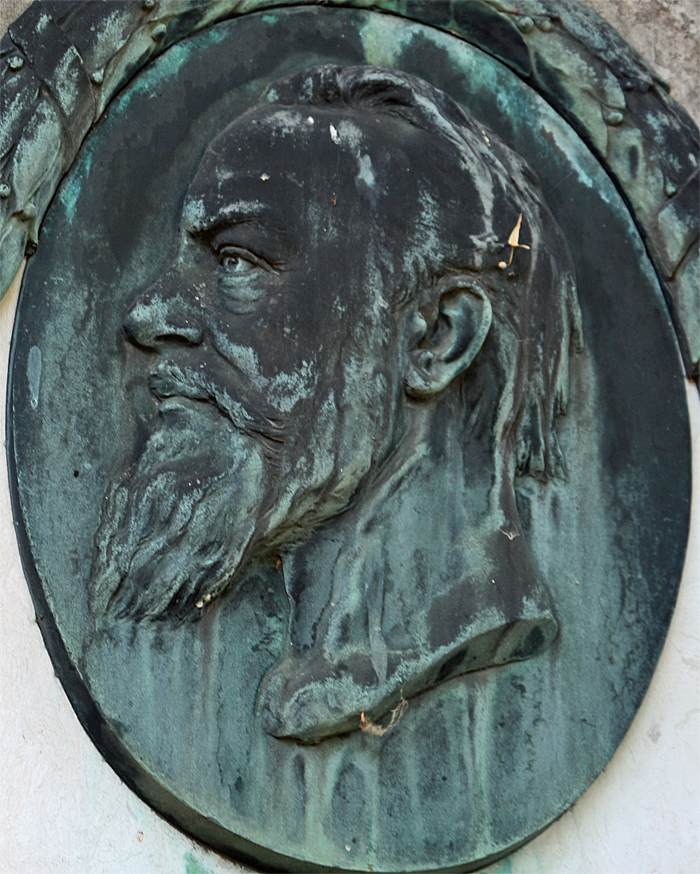
Relief on Neumann's grave
