= Faculty of Architecture, University of Zagreb =

Faculty of the University of Zagreb, Croatia

University of Zagreb Faculty of Architecture
- Arhitektonski fakultet Sveučilišta u Zagrebu
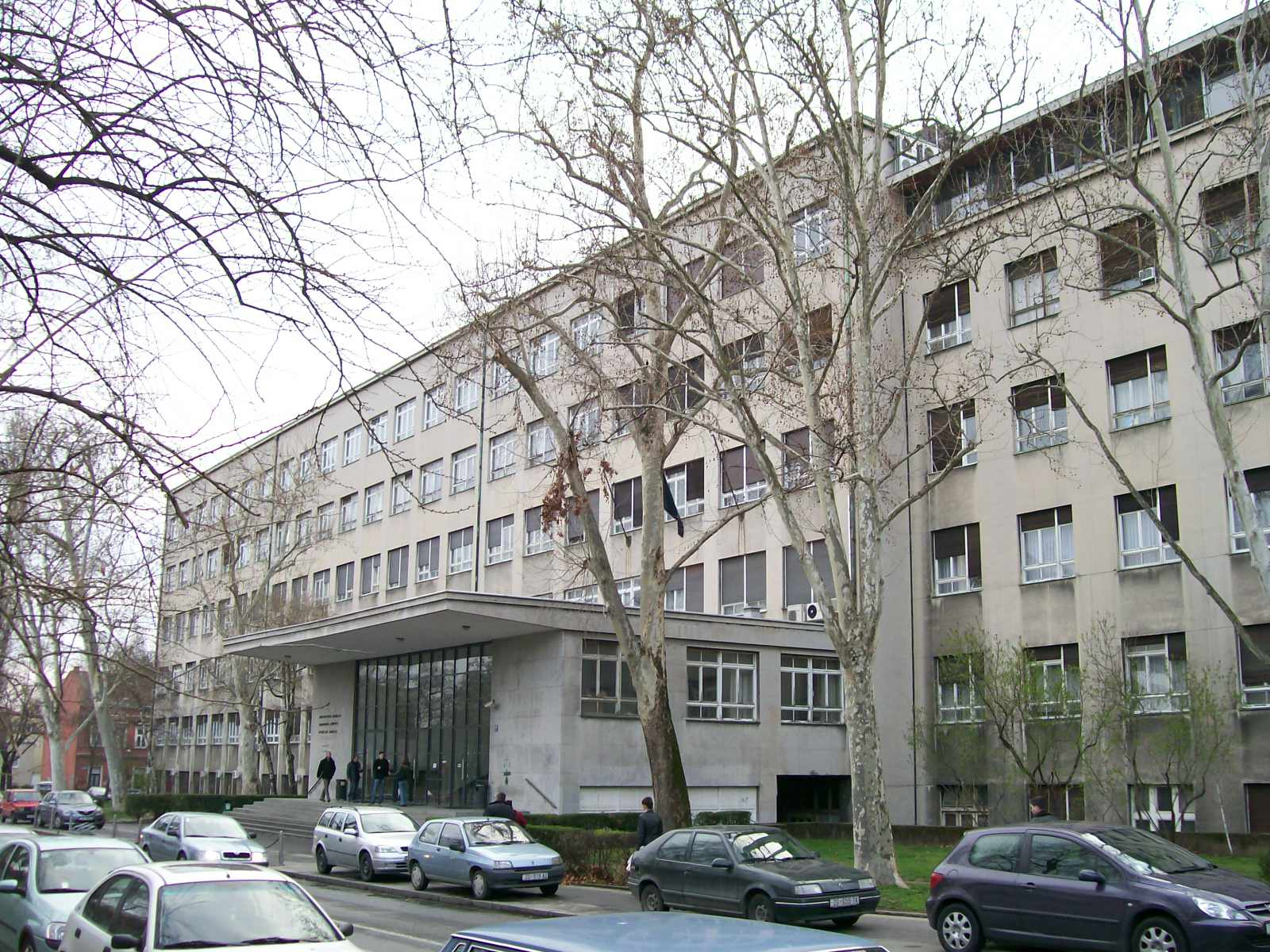
- Faculty building in Zagreb
- Type: Public
- Established: 1919 (as a part of Royal Technical College); 26 September 1962 (newly established Faculty of Architecture)
- Endowment: 61.4 million HRK (2009.)
- Dean: Bojan Baletić
- Faculty: 121
- Administrative staff: 68
- Students: 1017
- Location: Zagreb, Croatia; 45°48′31.1″N 15°57′48.5″E
- Campus: Urban
- Website: arhitekt.unizg.hr/en

The Faculty of Architecture (Croatian: Arhitektonski fakultet, abbr: Af) is one of the faculties of the University of Zagreb. It is one of the biggest schools of architecture in Southeastern Europe, as well as one of the biggest research-and-development institution in the fields of architecture and urban design in Croatia. The faculty aims to prepare experts to approach complex issues of architecture and urban design. The faculty building, which is located in Kačić-Miošić street in Lower Town in Zagreb, is shared with Faculty of Civil Engineering and Faculty of Geodesy.

== Organisation ==
The Faculty comprises 4 departments:

- Architectural design
- Urban planning, physical planning, and landscape architecture
- Architectural structures and building construction
- Theory and history of architecture

== History ==
Early beginnings of faculty go back to 1919 with foundation of the Royal Technical College in Zagreb with goal of educating professional experts, who previously went to study in Vienna or Prague, both in engineering and scientific fields. Among the six proposed departments was the Department of Architecture and Civil Engineering. In 1926., previously independent college, becomes a part of the University of Zagreb, as a Faculty of Technology. At that time, another school of architecture, led by Drago Ibler was established at the Academy of fine arts. These two institutions are considered to be predecessors of the modern-day Faculty of Architecture.

The Faculty of Architecture, Civil Engineering and Geodesy was formed on 1 July 1956 when the College of Technology of the University of Zagreb was divided into four new faculties. The faculty existed under this name until 1962 when it was divided in current layout.

In 1989. the School of design was formed. It is an interdisciplinary programme held in collaboration with faculties of Forestry, Economics and Business, Humanities and Social Sciences, Mechanical Engineering and Naval Architecture and the Academy of Fine Arts

== Study programmes ==
=== Architecture and urban design ===
The study of architecture and urban design is a five-year-long programme divided into two cycles. The Bachelor of Architecture (B.Arch.)(Croatian: sveučilišni prvostupnik inženjer arhitekture i urbanizma, abbr: univ. bacc. ing. arch.) is an undergraduate academic degree awarded to a student after three years of studying. The study ends after two years of graduate programme, when a student becomes Master of Architecture (M.Arch.) (Croatian: Magistar inženjer arhitekture i urbanizma, abbr: Mag. ing. arch.). The study programme is comparable to those by eminent European faculties, especially ETH Zurich, RWTH Aachen, TU Delft and TU Wien.

=== Interdisciplinary study programme of design ===
The study programme includes a three-year-long programme of undergraduate study (Bachelor) and a two-year-long programme of graduate study (Master of Design) in the fields of industrial design and visual communications design

== Admission into the undergraduate study programme ==
Entry requirements:

- finished four-year high school
- passed state exam (Državna Matura), extended levels in all compulsory subjects are required
- passed classification procedure (three tests, covering visual and graphic abilities, spatial perception and general knowledge)

== Notable professors ==
- Viktor Kovačić
- Drago Ibler (at the Academy of Fine Arts, School of Architecture)
- Velimir Neidhardt

== Notable alumni ==
- Vjenceslav Richter
- Alfred Albini
- Radimir Čačić (former vice president of the Government of Croatia)
- Marina Matulović-Dropulić (former mayor of Zagreb)
- Aleksandar Ljahnicky
- 3LHD
