= Ante Topić Mimara =

Croatian art collector (1898–1987)

Ante Topić Mimara (7 April 1898 in Korušce – 30 January 1987 in Zagreb) was a Croatian art collector and philanthropist. He donated his collection of more than 3,700 artifacts, ranging from the prehistoric to the 20th century periods, to the National Museum of Serbia in Belgrade and the museum named after him - Mimara Museum in Zagreb. Most masterpieces of the Italian Collection and Dutch Collection in the National Museum of Serbia had been donated by Mimara.

In post-war years, Mimara was a consultant to the Yugoslav military mission in Berlin and Munich, where he worked on returning plundered works of art to Yugoslavia. In 1963, he sold the Cloisters Cross to the Metropolitan Museum of Art, and is vividly described by Thomas Hoving, who made the acquisition, in his book on the work.

== Controversy ==
Several highly respected art historians and contemporaries of Topić Mimara say that he appears to have stolen many of the items in his art collection while working for the Yugoslav military at a World War II art collection point.

According to Thomas Hoving, "Topic Mimara's hoard of masterpieces are 95 percent fakes produced by him and his hired forgers." On its opening, a "prominent Yugoslav art historian" told AP that "it might be the greatest collection of fakes in the world." According to Konstantin Akinsha, Ante Topić Mimara built his collection by forging, but also by looting and swindling.

== See also ==
- Art theft and looting during World War II

== Notes ==
For notes referring to sources, see bibliography below.
