= Mimara Museum =

Coordinates: 45°48′30″N 15°58′01″E

- Zbirka umjetnina Ante i Wiltrude Topić Mimara

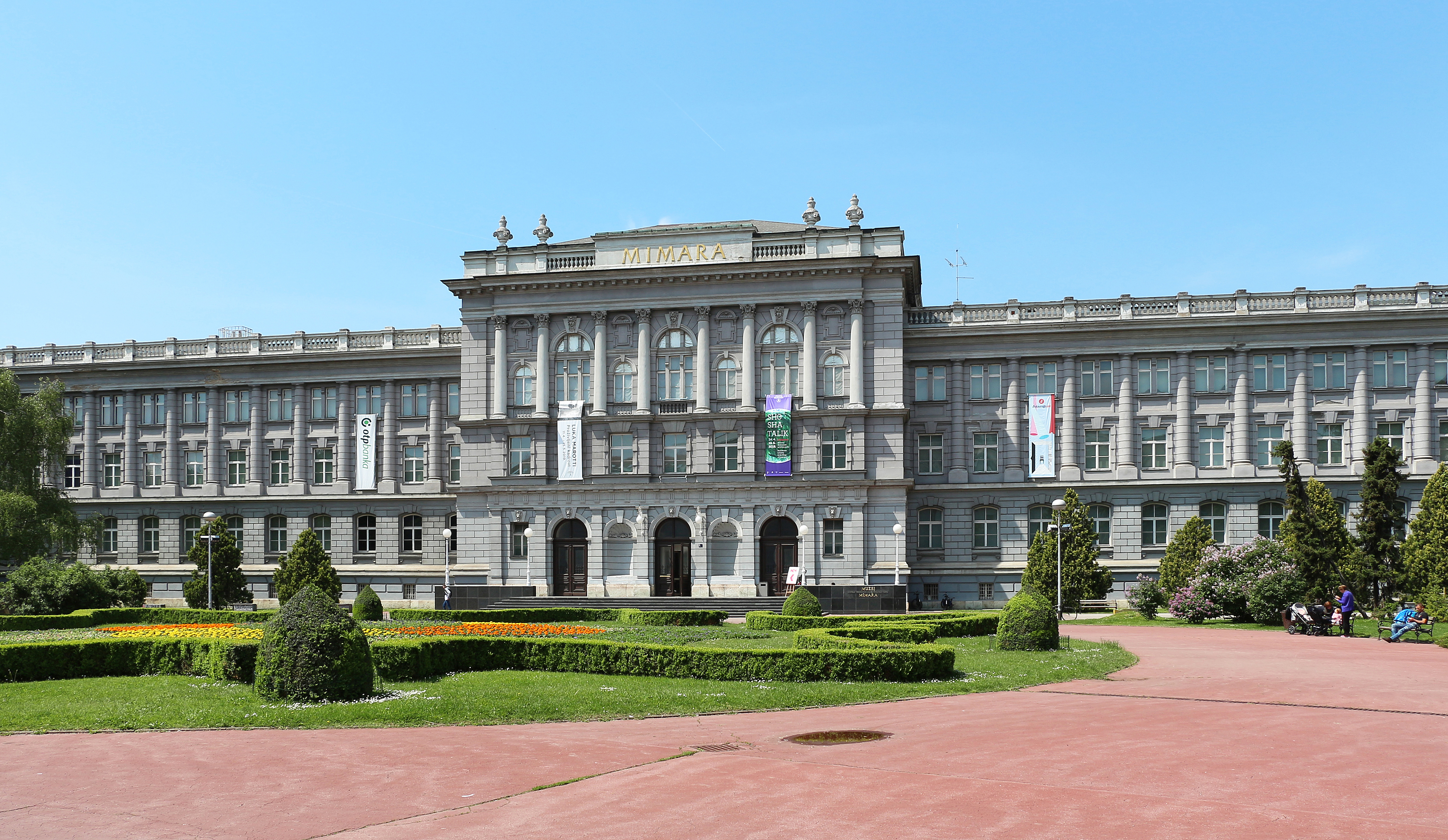
- Façade of the building on Roosvelt's Square
- Established: 17 July 1987; 39 years ago
- Location: Roosevelt Square 5, Lower Town, Zagreb
- Type: Art museum
- Visitors: 101,671 (2019)
- Founder: Ante Topić Mimara
- Director: Lada Ratković-Bukovčan
- Curators: Milica Japundžić, Slaven Perović, Lada Ratković-Bukovčan, Bruno Šeper, Iva Firm, Krešimir Juraga
- Architects: Alfred Ludwig; Teodor Hülsner
- Public transit access: ZET No. 12, 13, 14 and 17 tram stop: Roosevelt Square

Cultural Good of Croatia
- Official name: Zgrada Donjogradske gimnazije
- Type: Protected cultural good
- Reference no.: Z-459
- Website: www.mimara.hr

The Mimara Museum (Croatian: Zbirka umjetnina Ante i Wiltrude Topić Mimara or simply Muzej Mimara) is an art museum in the city of Zagreb, Croatia, opened on July 17, 1987. It is situated on Roosevelt Square, housing the collection by its founders; Ante Topić Mimara and his wife Wiltrud.

The museum, whose building is designed in the Beaux-Arts and Neo-Renaissance architecture style, houses a collection of over 3,750 objects, distributed across 9,453.79 m^{2} (101,759.7 sq ft), which makes it one of the largest art museums in the world. Collection includes Ptolemaic glassware from Alexandria, jade and ivory Qing-dynasty ornaments, 14th-century wooden crosses encrusted with semiprecious stones, and paintings from European masters such as Rubens, Giorgione, Bronzino, Bosch, Velázquez, van Dyck, Goya, Catena, Renoir and Degas. The museum catalogue comprises a wide range of works and collections, including paintings from Italian, Dutch, German, English, Flemish, French, and Spanish schools; drawings and prints; European sculpture and decorative arts; and collections of ancient civilizations, ivory, ceramics and porcelain, glass, furniture, textiles and carpets, as well as Chinese and other Asian art.

The museum was established in 1980 and opened in 1987. The building itself originates from the 19th century, its conversion to a museum overseen by a Zagreb architect Kuno Waidmann; originally it served as a gymnasium. With its prominent location, articulated layout, and formal façades, the complex holds significant architectural, urban, and contextual value in shaping Zagreb’s Lower Town. It is protected as a cultural asset and listed in the Register of Cultural Goods of Croatia.

== History ==
=== About its founder ===
Ante Topić Mimara (1898 – 1987), was born on April 7, 1898 in Korušce, and was a Croatian art collector, painter and restorer. From an early age, influenced by visits to Split and the archaeological site of Salona, as well as by the teachings of Frane Bulić, he developed a strong interest in history and cultural heritage. His formative years were marked by the First World War, during which he served as a soldier. After the war, in 1918, he moved to Rome, where he worked in the studio of Antonio Mancini and studied art restoration, further deepening his engagement with European art and laying the foundations for his later career as a collector. Starting in the mid-1920s he began collecting art objects, a hobby that grew into a significant collection over the years. He lived in Rome, Paris, Amsterdam, Munich, and Berlin, continuously expanding his collection throughout his life. Even before World War II Mimara had a noteworthy art collection, with professional texts about his works appearing in prestigious German art magazines.

He regularly participated in auctions and visited the major European antiquarian markets and numerous exhibitions across the continent, establishing himself as a devoted connoisseur of art. Mimara maintained close relationships with a wide circle of prominent art historians and archaeologists. The significance of his collection is perhaps best illustrated by the words of Otto von Falke, founder of the Kunstgewerbemuseum in Cologne and director of the Berlin Museums: "…within a very diverse private collection… there are several well-preserved works of high quality."

=== Museum founding ===
In 1948 Ante Topić Mimara made his first donation by giving numerous paintings and sculptures to Strossmayer's gallery in Zagreb and National Museum of Serbia in Belgrade, which was later presented in an exhibition in 1969. He continued to expand his collection with great passion, transforming it into a true treasure that reflects the artistic achievements of millennia. Mimara lived in Tangier and Salzburg, spending his final years in Zagreb. In 1973, he formalized the foundation of a new museum through a donation agreement, intended to be established in Zagreb, and supplemented the collection with an addendum in 1986. To realize his vision, the central space of the so-called School Forum on Roosevelt Square 5, was adapted for the museum. Mimara approved the permanent exhibition plan, carefully detailed in a 1986 scenario. However, he died in Zagreb on 30 January 1987, before the museum's official opening. The foundation of today's Mimara Museum was established through his major donations between 1973 and 1986, including works from his collection and those of his wife, Wiltrud Topić Mersmann.

Upon its opening in 1987, the museum’s art collection came under scrutiny from several art critics and historians. According to Thomas Hoving, "Topic Mimara's hoard of masterpieces are 95 percent fakes produced by him and his hired forgers.". According to Federico Zeri, the preview contained "trash along with some good things. Ninety percent is junk."; Ante Topić Mimara built his collection by forging, but also by looting and swindling. According to David Ekserdjian, Mimara "was pathologically inclined to believe his ugliest ducklings were the most gorgeous of swans. In consequence, and in spite of energetic attempts since his death to study his collection with appropriate rigour, as a rule a good dose of scepticism remains the correct response to the attributional optimism on display at the Mimara Museum in Zagreb"

The museum denied these claims, maintaining on multiple occasions the authenticity and accurate attribution of its artworks, and asserting that both internal evaluations and independent expert analyses had confirmed the integrity and provenance of the collection.

=== Building ===
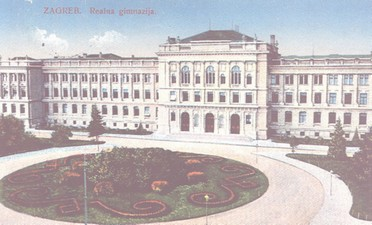
The Museum building in 1930s

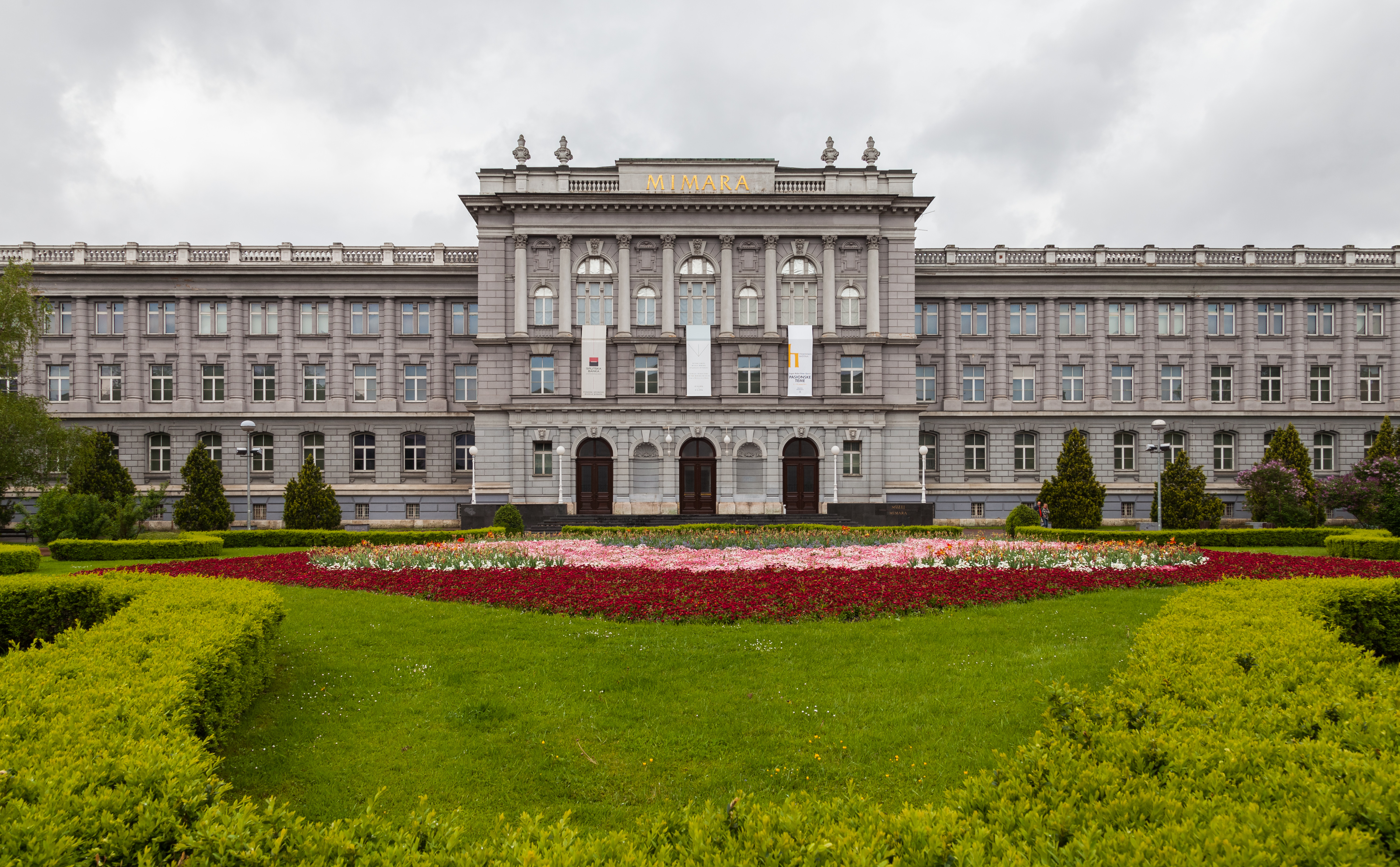
Mimara Museum, 2014

The Mimara Museum is housed within the architectural complex of the Zagreb's Lower Town gymnasiums, a free-standing, two-storey U-shaped structure built between 1894 and 1895 in the spirit of historicism. A notable example of a Neo-Renaissance and Beaux-Arts palace, the building was designed by the German architects Alfred Ludwig and Ljudevit Teodor Hülssner of Leipzig, specialists in building schools in the Austro-Hungarian Empire. Commissioned in 1892 and opened in 1895 on the occasion of the visit of Franz Joseph I of Austria to Zagreb, it was originally intended to house three educational institutions—a Royal Real Gymnasium, the Royal Lower Town Classical Gymnasium, and a Higher School of Commerce—with shared museum and gymnasium facilities, forming part of an unrealised school forum conceived by Izidor Kršnjavi. The main wing was later adapted into a museum and opened to the public as today - Mimara Museum in 1987.

Situated in the historical centre of Zagreb close to the Green Horseshoe system of city parks, the neoclassical museum building dating from the second half of the 19th century is part of the typical urban architecture of Zagreb's Lower Town. It was built in 1896 as a complex of school buildings. Built in pseudo-renaissance style of the Italian urban palaces, the building is classified as architectural heritage protected by the Ministry of Culture of the Republic of Croatia. The monumental school building was built on the initiative of Doctor Izidor Kršnjavi, a prominent Croatian figure in the late 19th century. The museum's atrium and the former school gym was built in the style of ancient Greek temples.

=== Collections ===
Mandoline and Guitar (1913),
Pablo Picasso (exhibition in Mimara Museum, 2019)

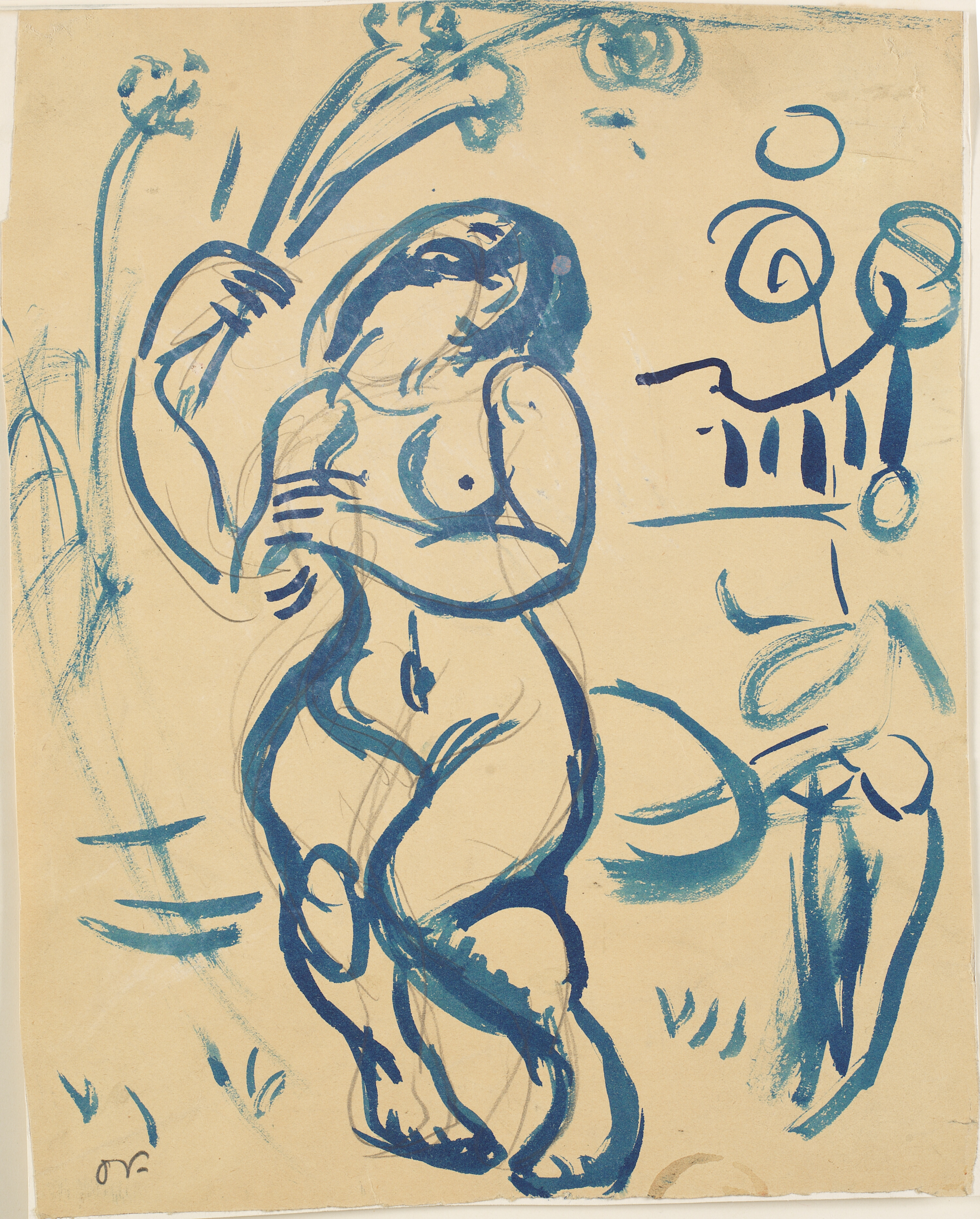
Standing naked woman (1908), Othon Friesz (exhibition in Mimara Museum, 2005)

Collections within the museum:

- A collection of ancient civilizations
- Collection of drawings, graphics and illuminations
- Collection of European sculpture
- Collection of ivory
- Collection of metals and other materials
- Collection of ceramics and porcelain
- Glass collection
- Collection of furniture
- A collection of textiles and rugs
- Collection of Far Eastern art
- Collection of icons
- Flemish painting
- Spanish painting
- French painting
- Italian painting
- English painting
- Dutch painting
- German, Austrian and Swiss painting

=== Exhibitions ===
Mimara Museum held numerous of exhibitions including; Pablo Picasso (2019), Othon Friesz (2005), Zbirka Morton (2020), Ivica Propadalo (2019), Katica Gajski (2019), Nada Zec Ivanović (2019), Andrea Alessi (2019), Neda Miranda Blažević-Krietzman (2019), Dimitrije Popović (2019), Shosha Talik (2019), Hrvoje Marko Peruzović (2019), Nada Žiljak (2018), Andrej Grabrovec (2017), Karim Rashid (2017), Ivica Vlašić (2016), Mary Beale (2016), Paul Gavarni (2013), Croatian Apoxyomenos (2012), Aleksandar Ljahnicky (1994) and many more.

== Artworks ==
Collection highlights
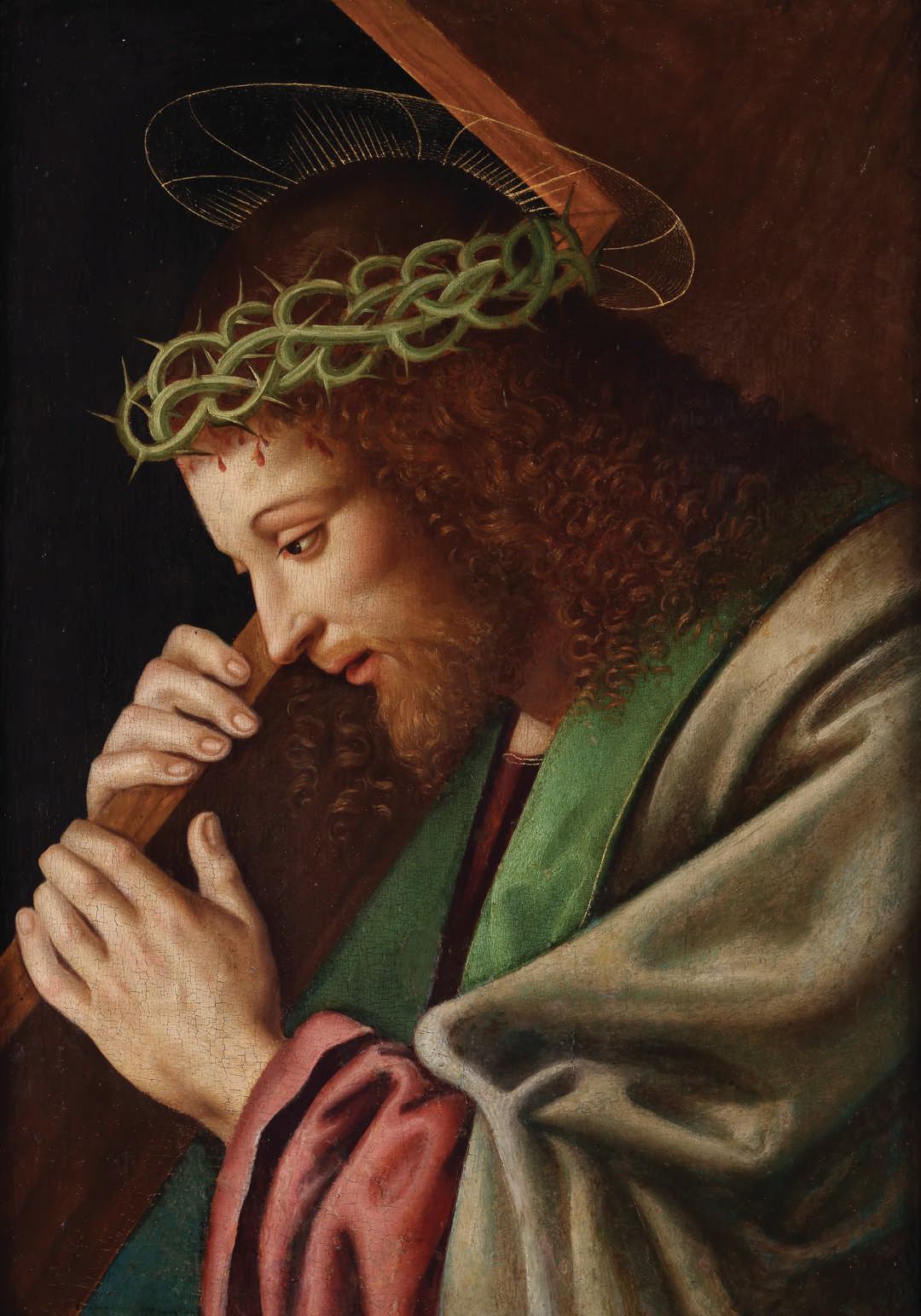
Christ Carrying the Cross (1525), Vincenzo Catena

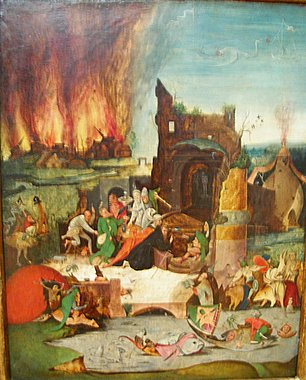
The Temptation of Saint Anthony c. 1501, attributed to Hieronymus Bosch or of his protégés

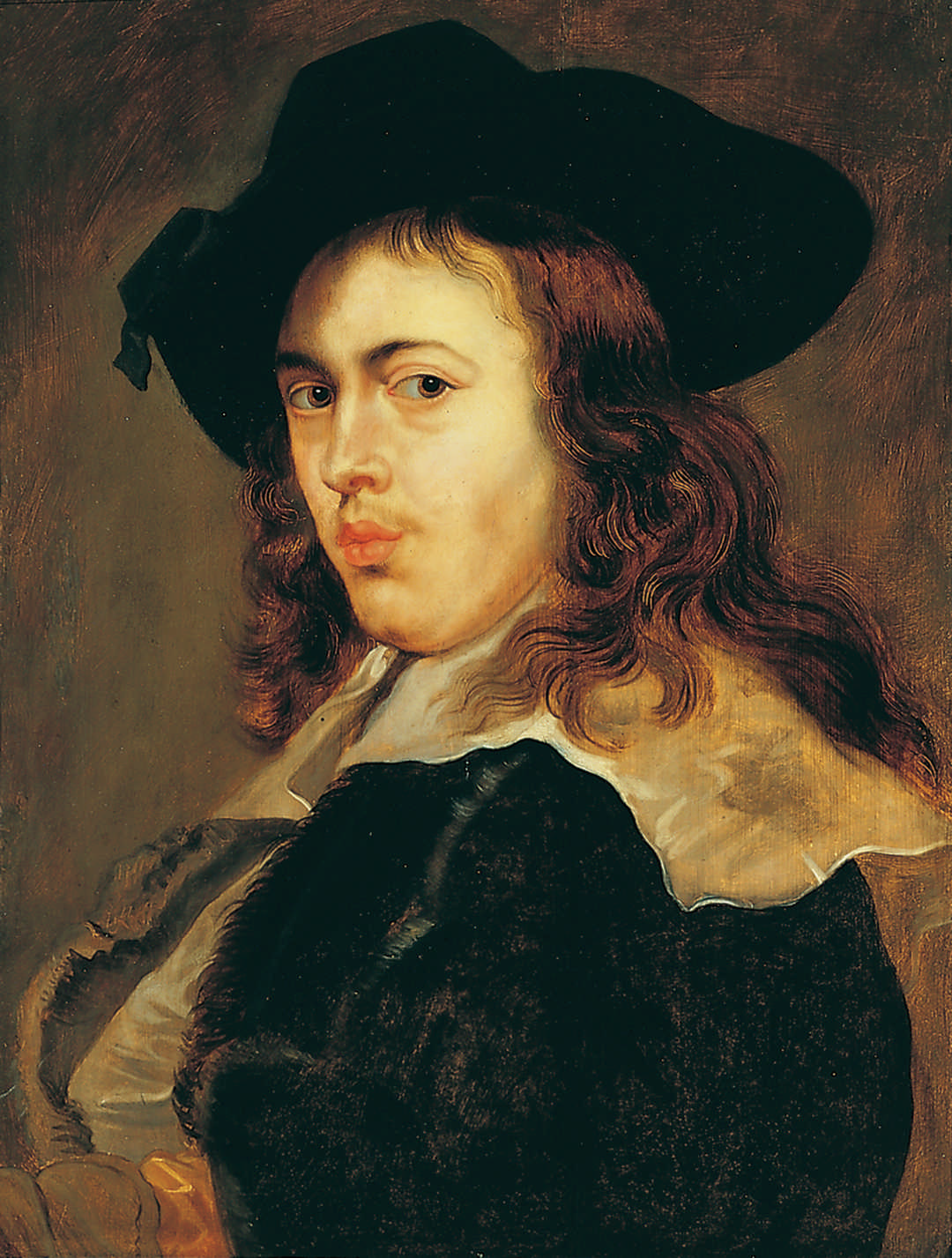
The Portrait of Nicolaas Rubens c. 1634–1636, Peter Paul Rubens

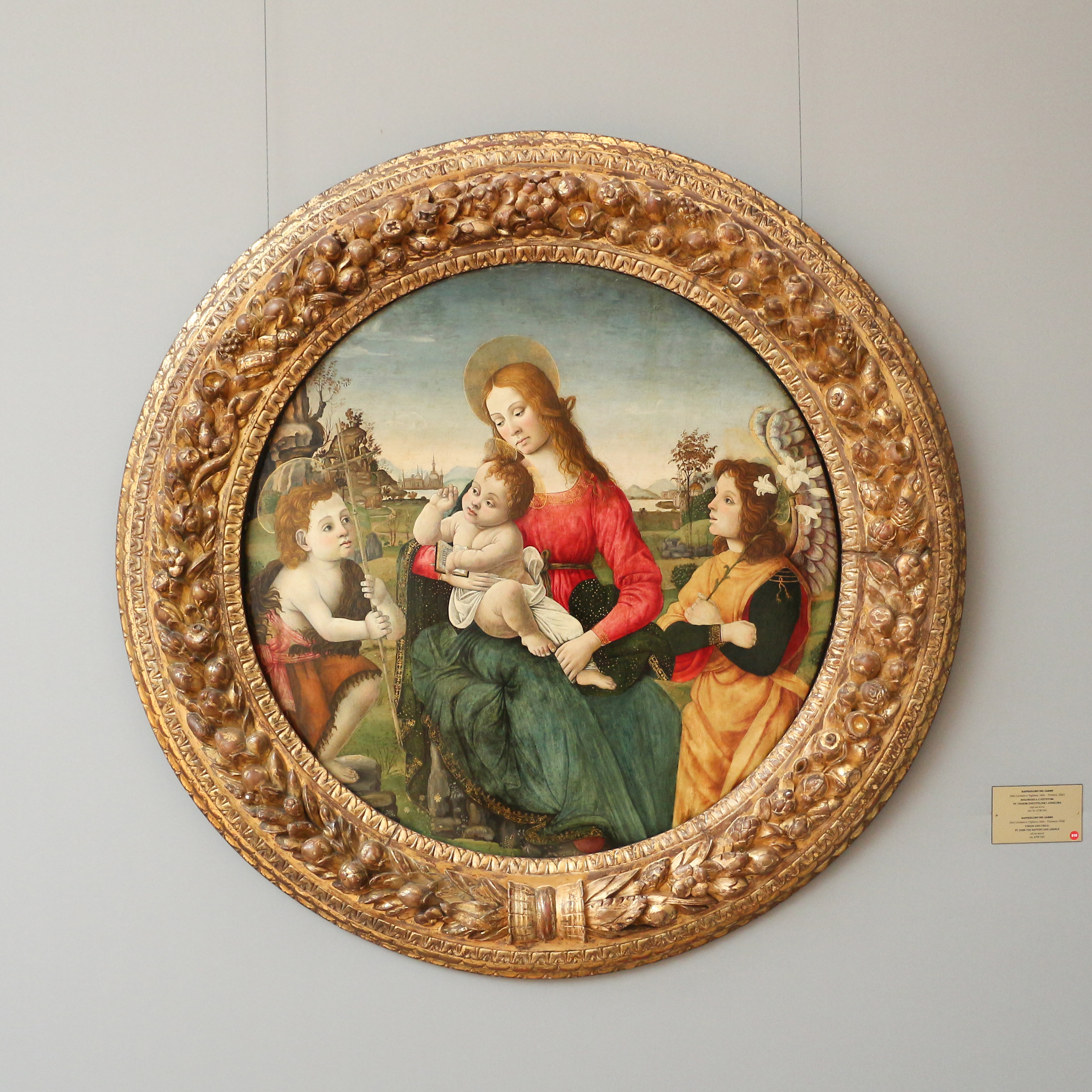
John the Baptist, undated, Raffaellino del Garbo

Oysters, c. 1860–1862, Édouard Manet

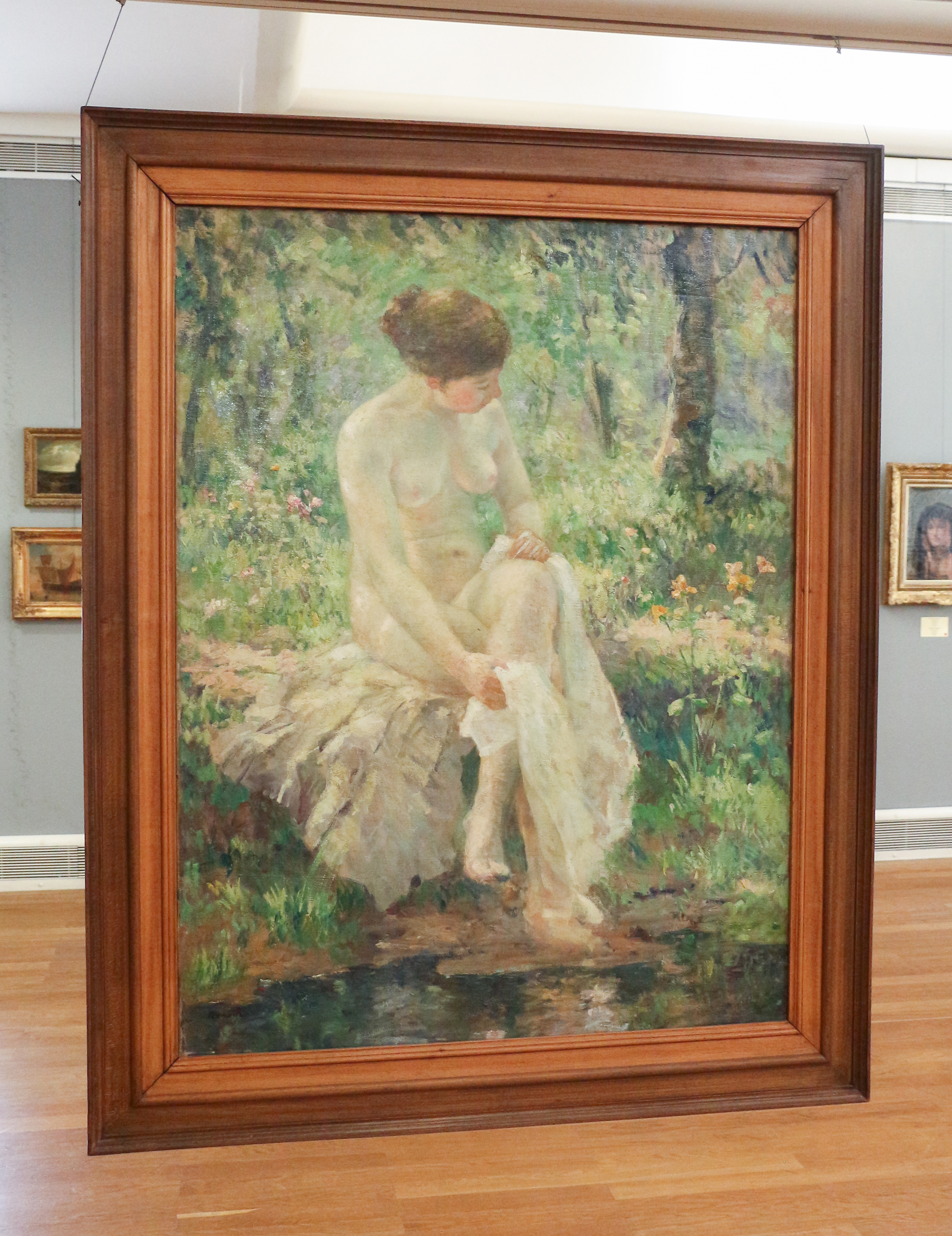
Woman Bathing (1868-1869), Pierre-Auguste Renoir

Portrait of a man, c. 1638–1640, Anthony van Dyck

Le Pont à Rouen, late 19th century, Camille Pissarro

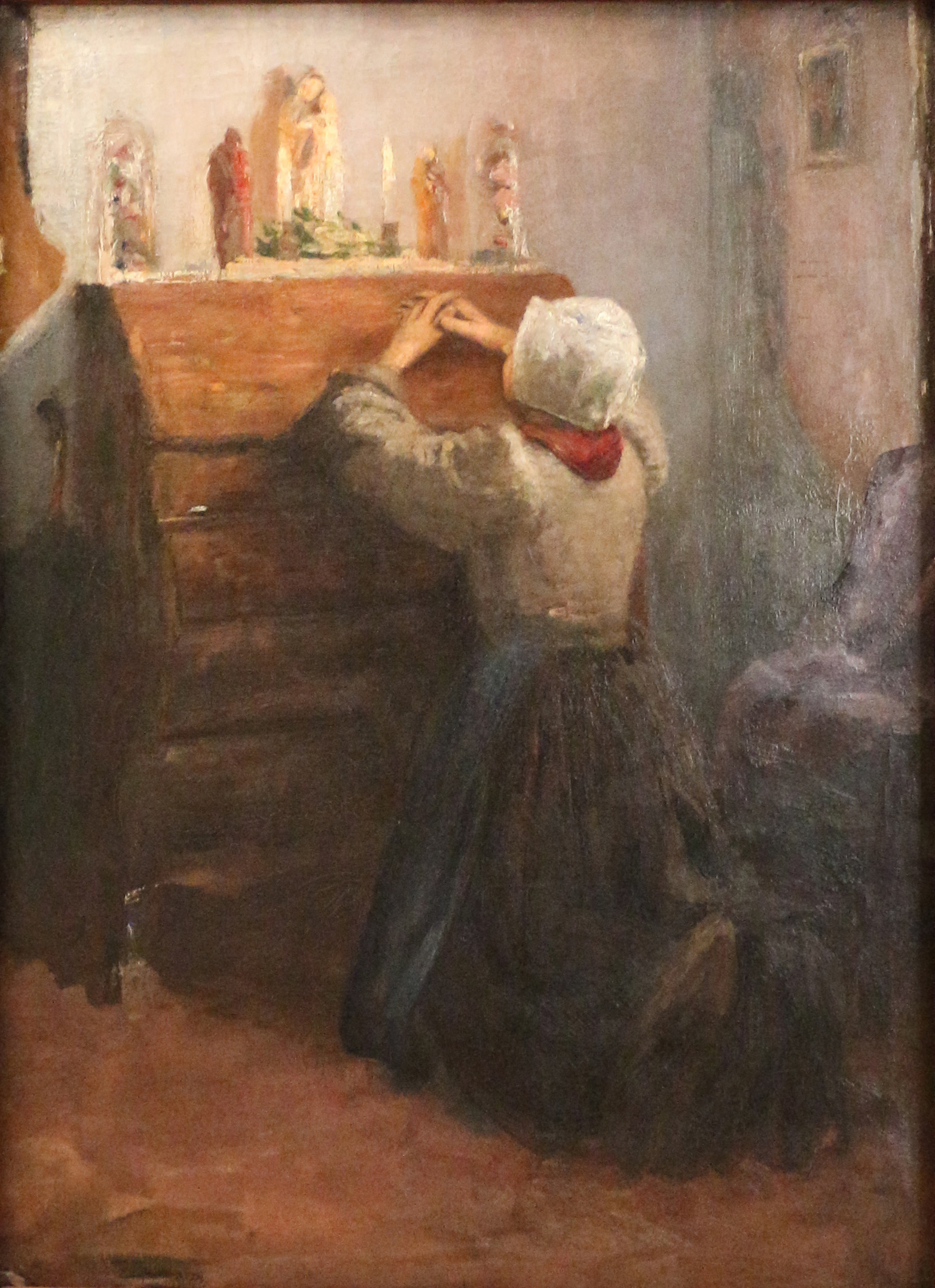
Girl Praying (1864), Pierre-Auguste Renoir

Landscape, undated, Vincent Van Gogh or his protégés

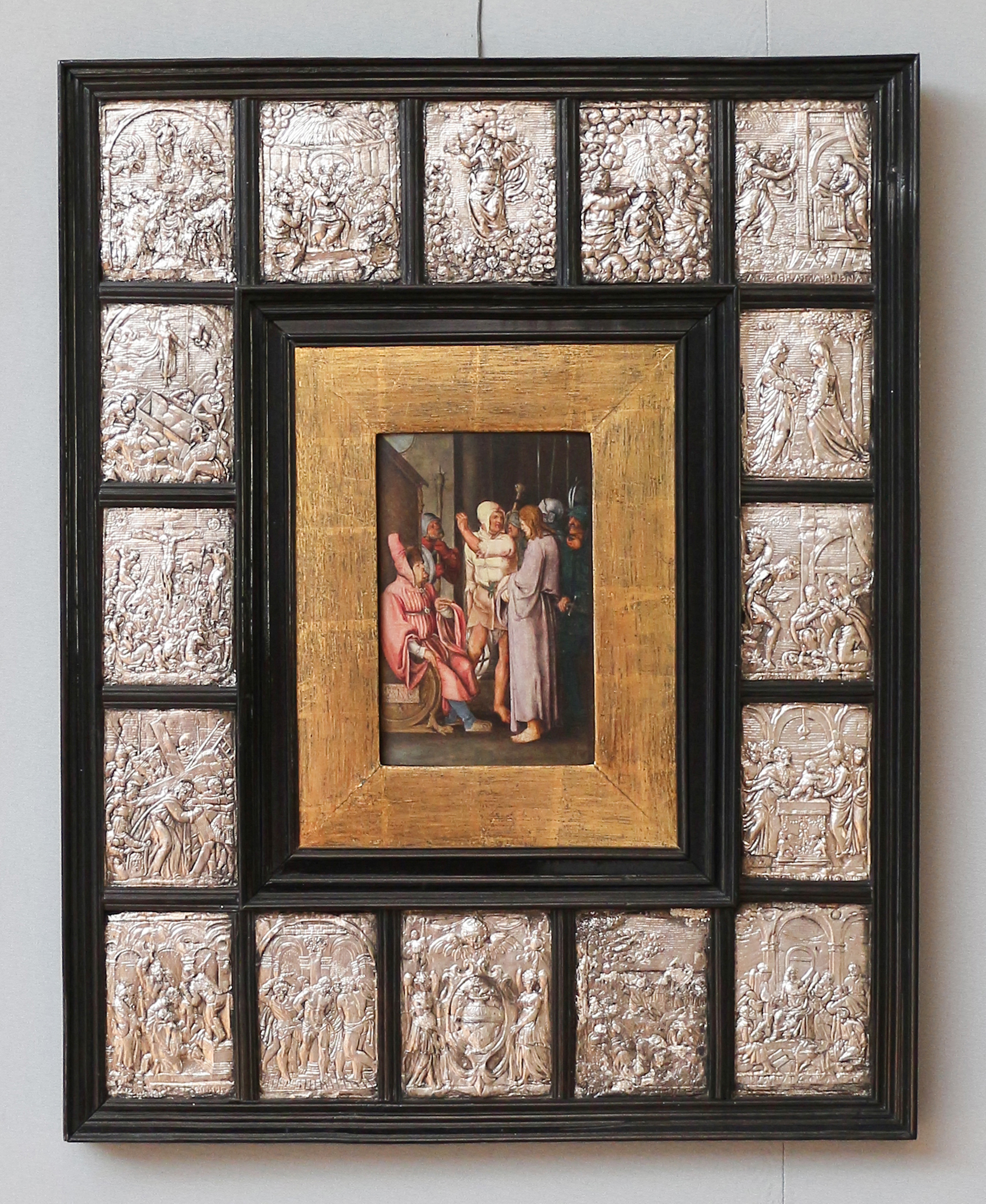
Engraving, (1520) Lucas Van Leyden

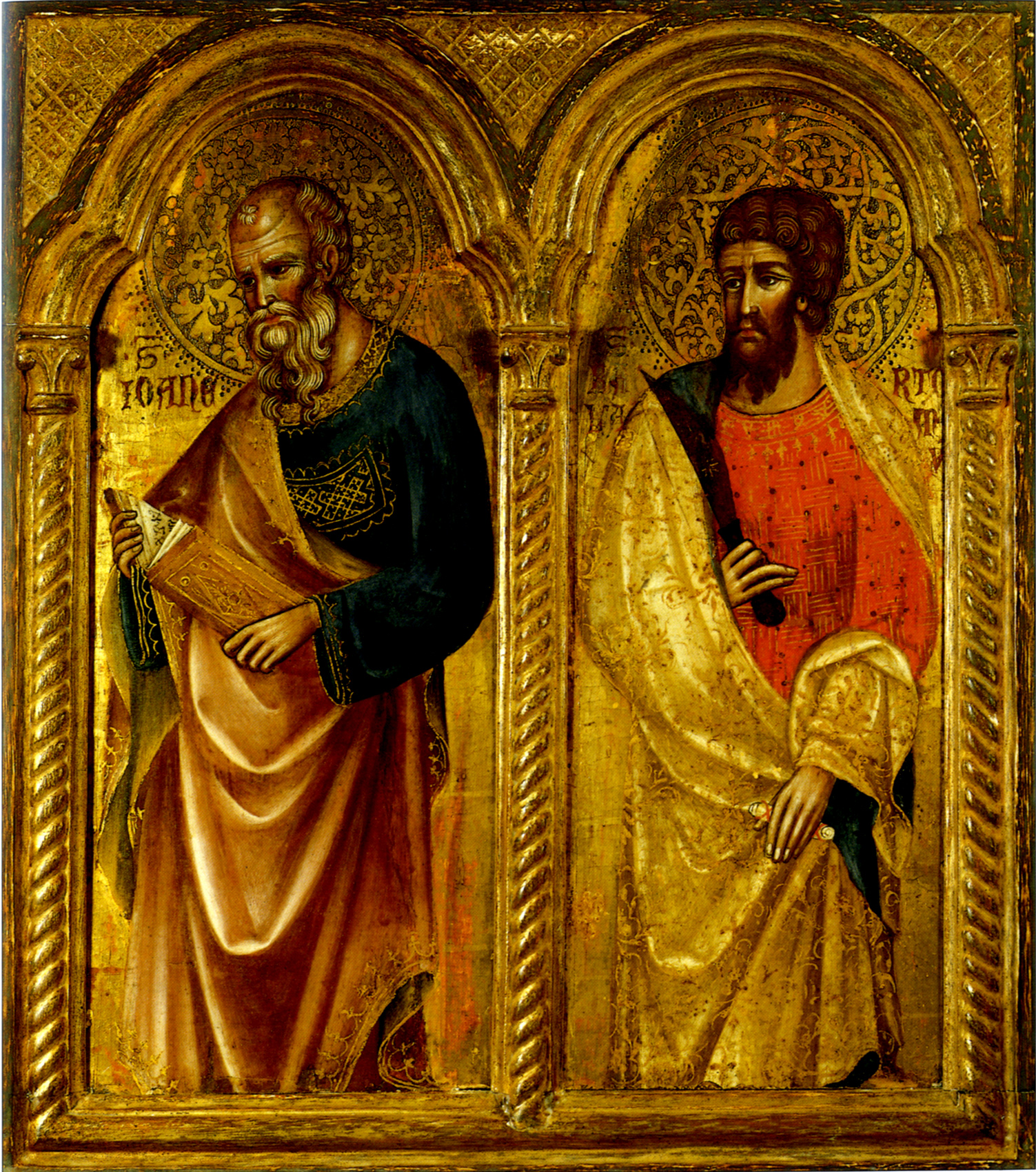
Apostles St James and St Bartholomew (ca.1345), Paolo Veneziano

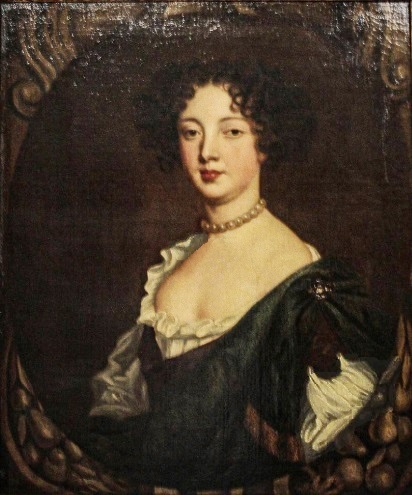
Louise de Kerouaille (17th century), Mary Beale

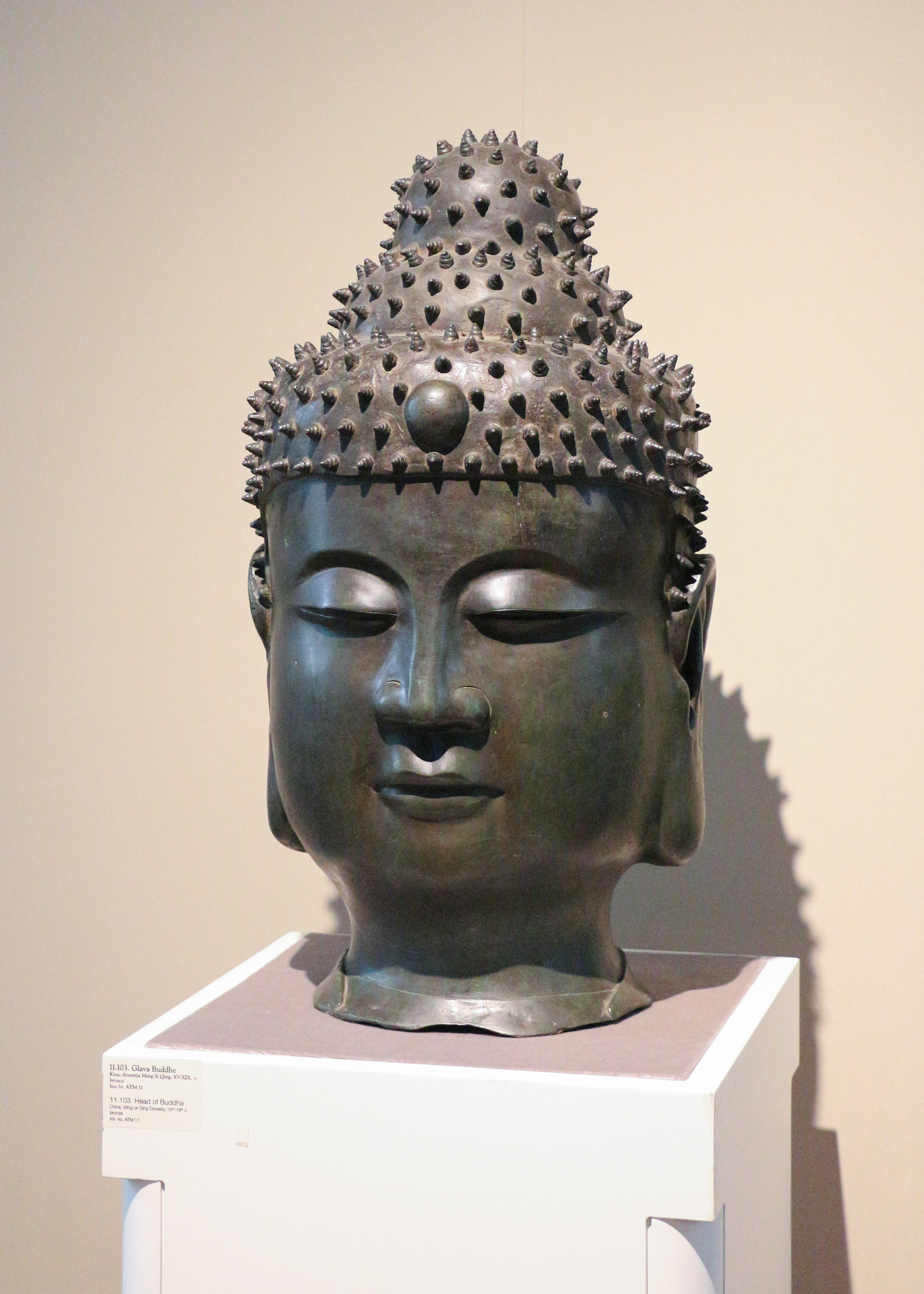
Head of Buddha from Ming dynasty, bronze

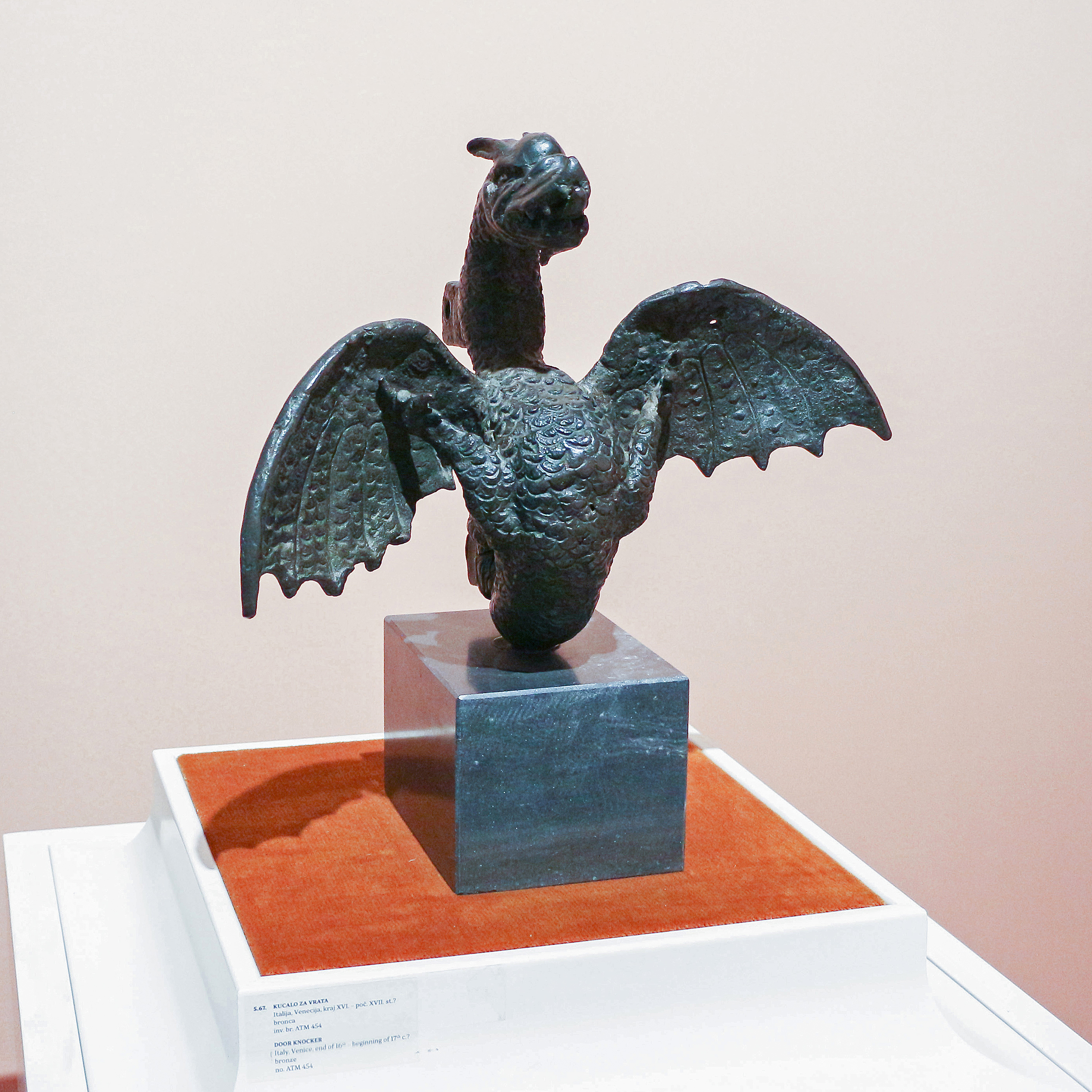
Door Knocker from Venice, Italy, 16 century, bronze.

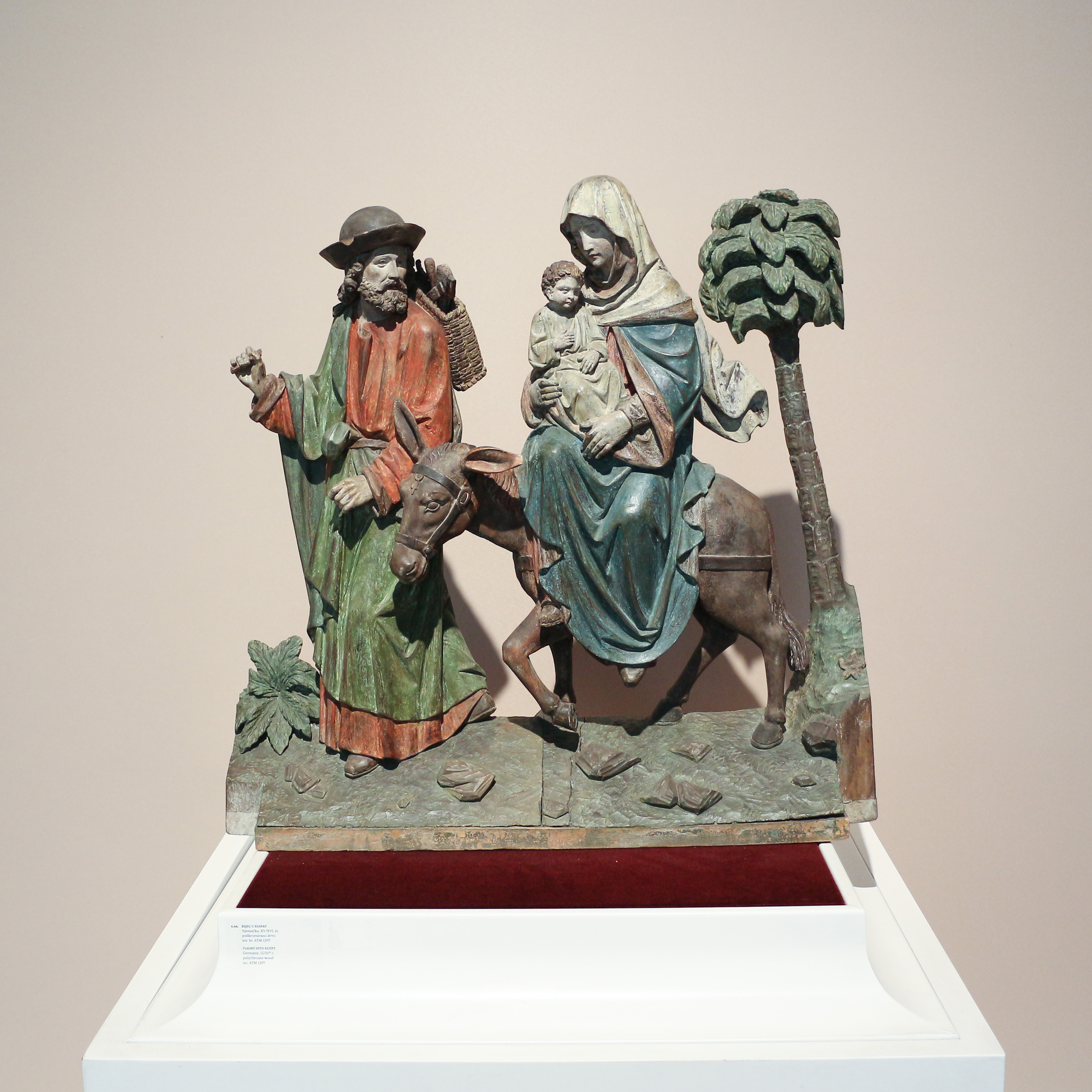
Flight into Egypt (Germany), polychrome wood, 16 century.

== Museum Today ==
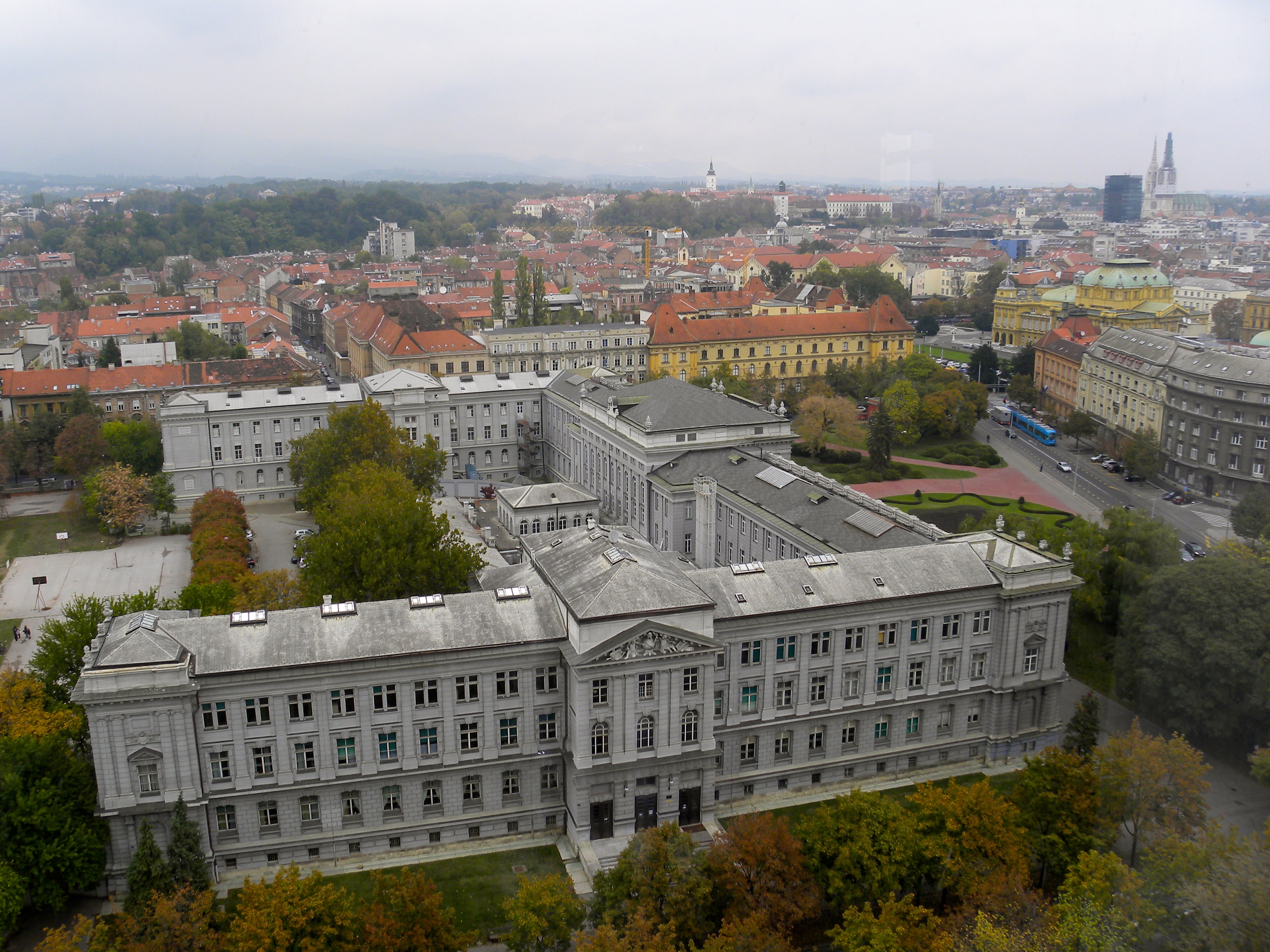
View at Mimara Museum from The Westin Zagreb

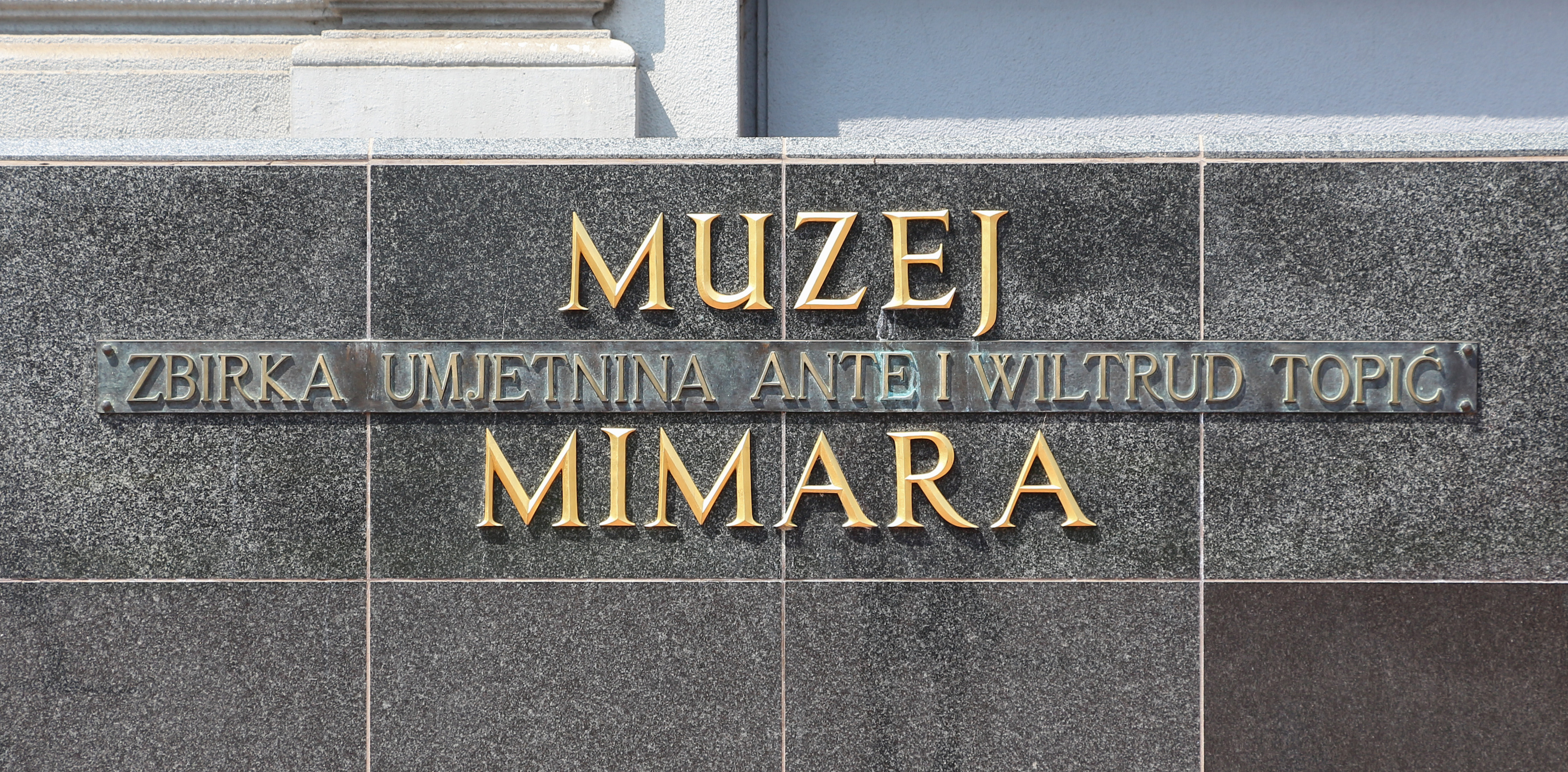
Museum plaque

The Mimara Museum is the most important museum in Zagreb and one of the largest art collections in Southeastern Europe. The glass collection covers the history of glassmaking from 2000 B.C. to the late 19th century and includes fine samples of the glass making tradition in Venice and Murano. The Oriental collection includes items made of fine china, semi-precious stones and other luxury materials.

The first floor is dedicated to ancient civilizations and a collection of European sculpting art and crafts, including artefacts from the Mesopotamian civilization, Egypt, ancient Greece and Rome. The oldest piece in the collection is a bone figurine of Venus from the early Paleolithic age. Almost all historical styles of sculpture present in European civilization are represented in this collection, from Romanesque sacral art to 20th-century sculpture. Crafts are represented in collections of artefacts made of ivory, china, textiles, metal and other materials, and a furniture collection dating from the late 15th to the early 19th century that is part of the museum's permanent display.

Of the total of 3,700 varied works of art, more than 1,500 exhibits constitute permanent holdings, dating from the prehistoric period up to the 20th century. Some of the most famous exhibits which include works from Lorenzetti, Giorgione, Veronese, Paolo Veneziano, Canaletto, 60 paintings to the Dutch masters Van Goyen, Ruisdael, 50 works from the Flemish masters Van der Weyden, Bosch, Rubens, Van Dyck, more than 30 to the Spanish masters Velázquez, Murillo, Goya, some 20 paintings to the German masters Holbein, Liebermann, Leibl, some 30 paintings to the English painters Gainsborough, Turner, Bonington and more than 120 paintings from the French masters Georges de La Tour, Boucher, Chardin, Delacroix, Corot, Manet, Renoir, Pissarro, Degas. The drawings collection holds some 200 drawings from Bronzino, Guardi, Claude Lorrain, Le Brun, Oudry, Greuze, Géricault, and Friesz.

=== Other activities ===
In addition to the gallery which is home to the art from the permanent display, art exhibitions are occasionally organised in the atrium, the collector's room on the ground floor, and the studio in the basement.

The atrium is used to host cultural events such as book promotions, award giving ceremonies in art and culture, press conferences and other types of events, including product or service presentations and gala dinners. There is also a multimedia hall which is used for lectures and screening events, and a Gymnasium Cafe with a large terrace, which also offers catering services for all types of events.

The grand hall on the second floor of the museum, where many old masters' paintings are displayed, is also used to host events, including concerts, business conferences, conventions, lectures. and presentations.

=== Reconstruction ===
The Mimara Museum faced significant damage during the 2020 Zagreb earthquake. It had to close its doors to visitors from March 22, 2020. The roof of the building and the fancy hall on the second floor got really damaged. Even some of the art on display got damaged, but they have been working on restoration. On October 27th, 2026, the restorations were completed. The institution welcomed visitors back on November 7th, 2026.

== See also ==
- List of museums in Croatia
- History of Zagreb
