= The Westin Zagreb =

High-rise hotel in Zagreb

Westin Zagreb Hotel

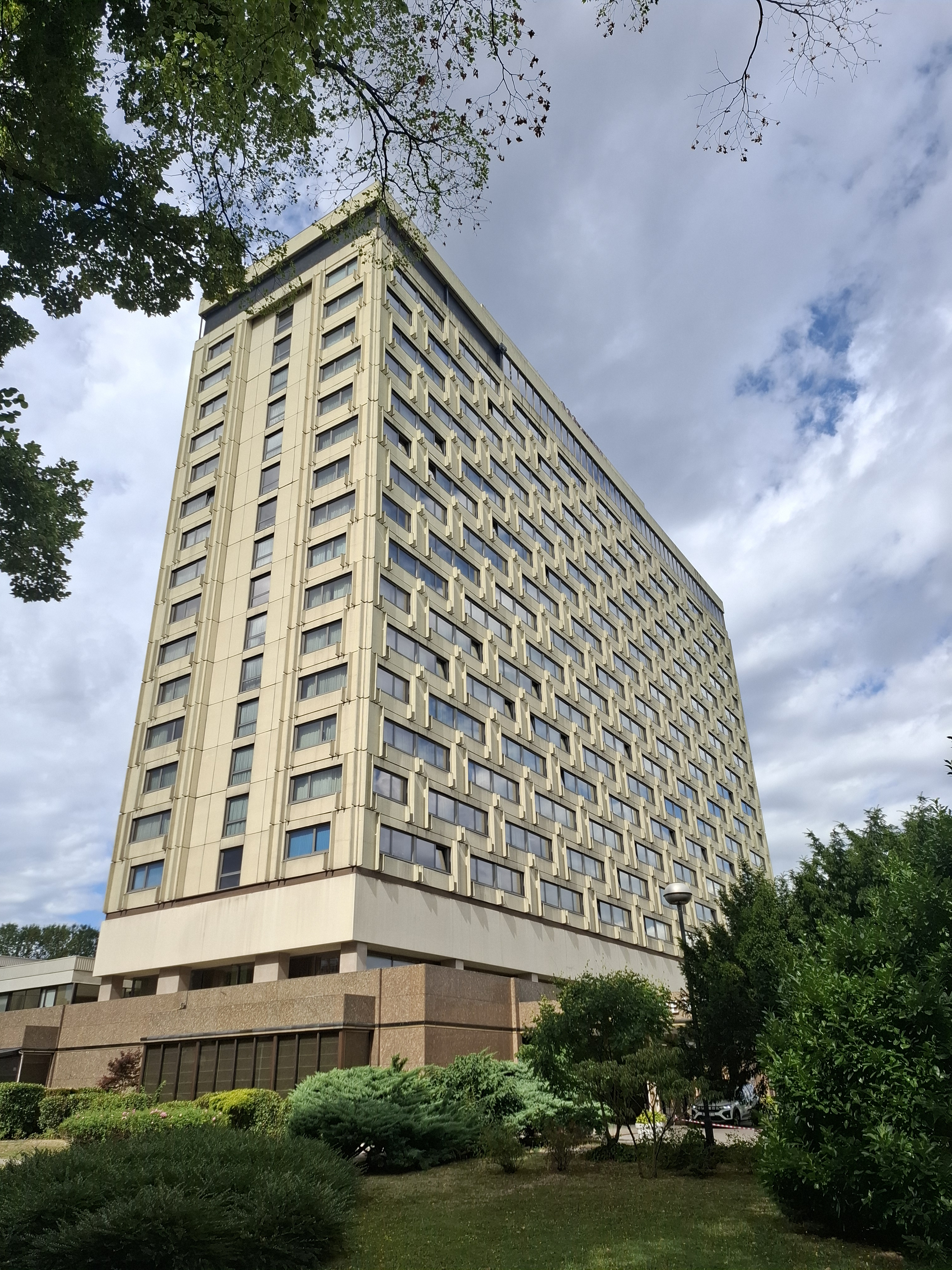
- Westin Hotel facade
- Hotel chain: Westin Hotels

General information
- Classification: 5 stars
- Location: 1 Isidora Kršnjavoga Street Zagreb, Croatia
- Coordinates: 45.80656°N 15.96601°E
- Opening: 1975
- Operator: Marriott International

Height
- Height: Roof: 215 ft (65.5 m); Antenna: 223 ft (68 m)

Technical details
- Floor count: 17
- Floor area: 1,406 m2 (Ball room)

Design and construction
- Architects: William Bonham, Slobodan Jovičić, Mira Hahl-Begović, Franjo Kamenski

Other information
- Number of rooms: 349
- Number of suites: 40
- Number of restaurants: Diana bar lounge & Terrace; Kaptol restaurant; Rendez Vous Cafe
- Parking: 200 spaces

Website
- www.marriott.com/en-us/hotels/zagwi-the-westin-zagreb/overview/

The Westin Zagreb is an upscale 349-room hotel in central Zagreb, Croatia. It is one of the largest hotels in Zagreb and is among the tallest buildings in Croatia. The Westin Zagreb is one of 19 Westin branded hotels in Europe and the only Westin in Croatia.

== History ==
The hotel building was built in 1975 and opened as InterContinental Zagreb, when the InterContinental Hotels chain moved from the Hotel Esplanade Inter-Continental (now Esplanade Zagreb Hotel) into a new building. The 17-storey building was the first hotel in Croatia purpose-built for an international hotel chain. The InterContinental chain left during the 1990s, when the hotel was taken over by entrepreneur Ivica Todorić. He changed the name to Opera, after the name of the restaurant that was then located on the last floor of the hotel. In 2002, the hotel was taken over by the hospitality-touristic company HUP Zagreb, and the hotel opened as The Westin Zagreb. Renovations costing 10 million Euro took place in 2013.

=== Notable guests ===
United States President George W. Bush stayed in the hotel in 2008 and United States Vice President Joe Biden stayed in the hotel in 2015, as well as American pop singer Britney Spears in 2011, during her concert in Zagreb. Other notable guests are: Condoleezza Rice, Vladimir Putin, Sofia Loren, Omar Sharif, Pierce Brosnan, Michael York, Robert Mitchum, Meryl Streep, Elizabeth Taylor, Richard Burton, Richard Gere, Armand Assante, Goldie Hawn, Andie MacDowell, Richard Chamberlain, Marlon Brando, Eric Clapton, Rolling Stones, Michael Bolton, Cesaria Evora, Misia, Iggy Pop, Nick Cave, Kaiser Chiefs, Alicia Keys, Franz Ferdinand, Moby, Massive Attack, Alberto Tomba, Ingemar Stenmark, Bode Miller, Michel Platini, Joseph Blatter, Lennart Johansson, Franz Beckenbauer and many others.

=== Hotel today ===
During the 2020 COVID pandemic, the Westin Zagreb was one of only a few hotels in Croatia to remain open for guests, during a time when there were only 179 guests staying in hotels in the entire country. It also hosted the Croatian Parliament in 2020 after an earthquake damaged the parliamentary building.

The Westin Zagreb hosted the 2026 European People's Party (EPP) Leaders' Retreat on 30–31 January 2026, hosted by Manfred Weber and Andrej Plenković. The two-day gathering brought together EPP leaders to discuss European and international affairs and the party's political priorities, including Ursula von der Leyen, Friedrich Merz, Donald Tusk and others.

== Gallery ==
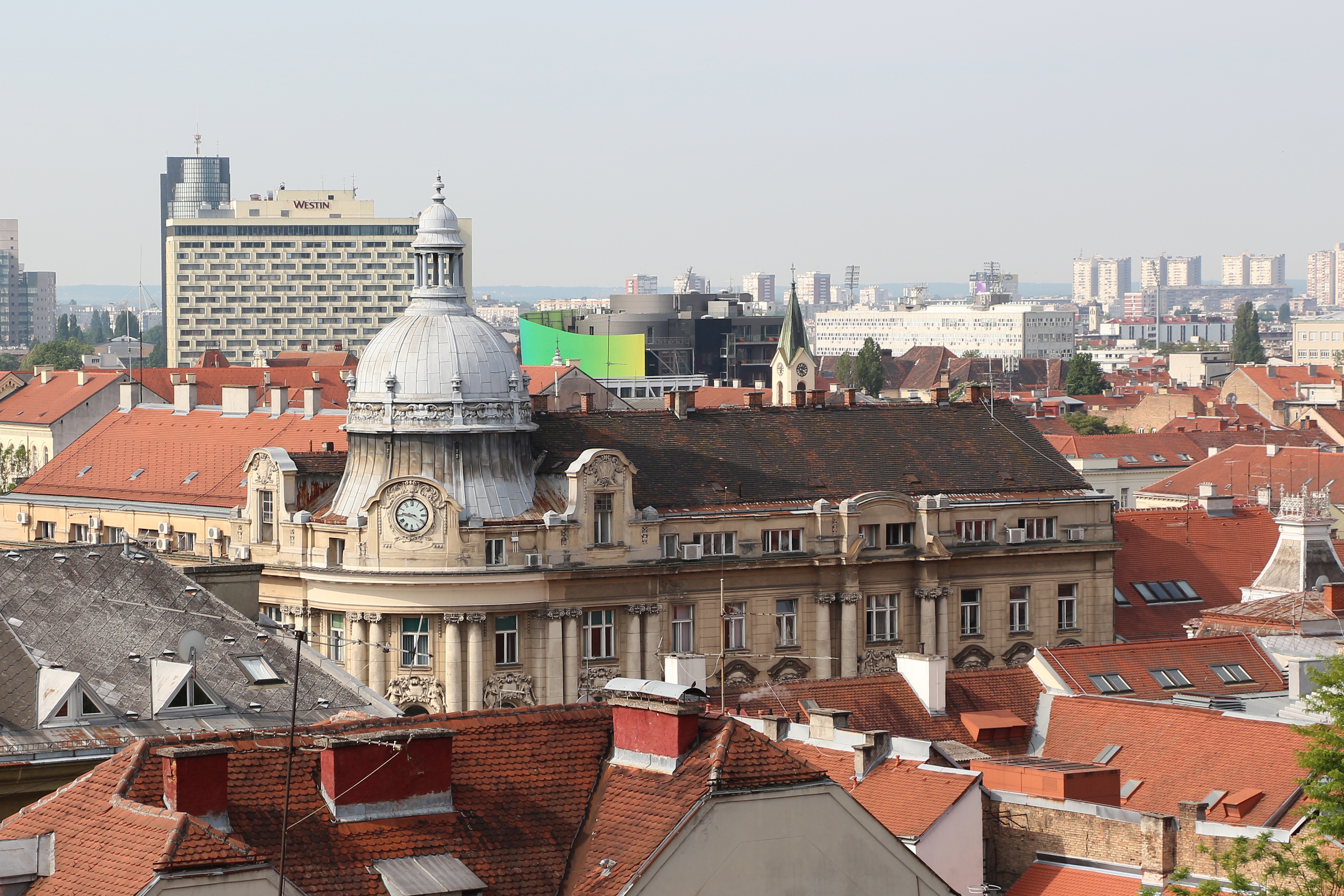
City skyline with The Westin Zagreb, from Upper Town

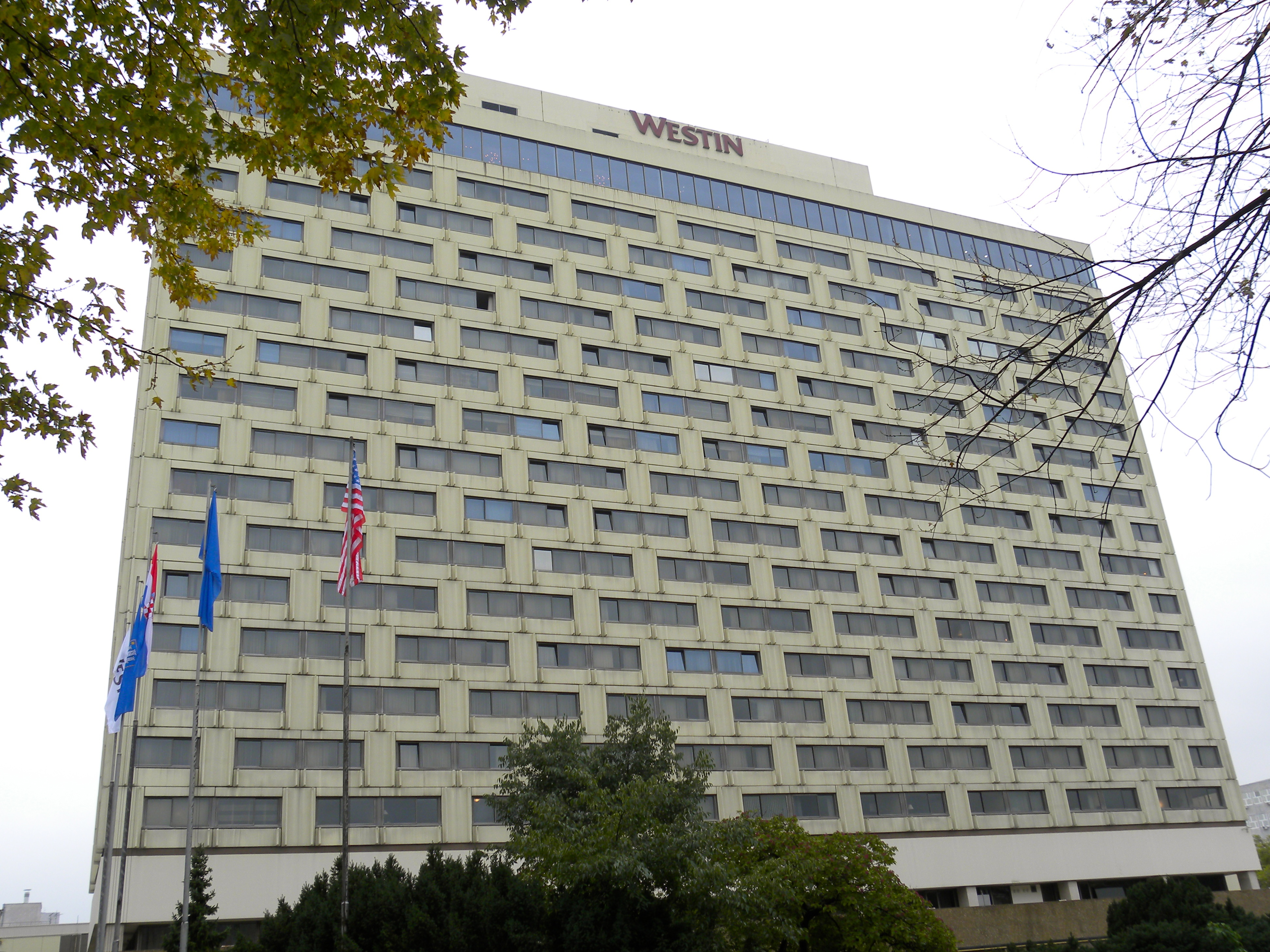
North view

2026 European People's Party (EPP) Leaders’ Retreat

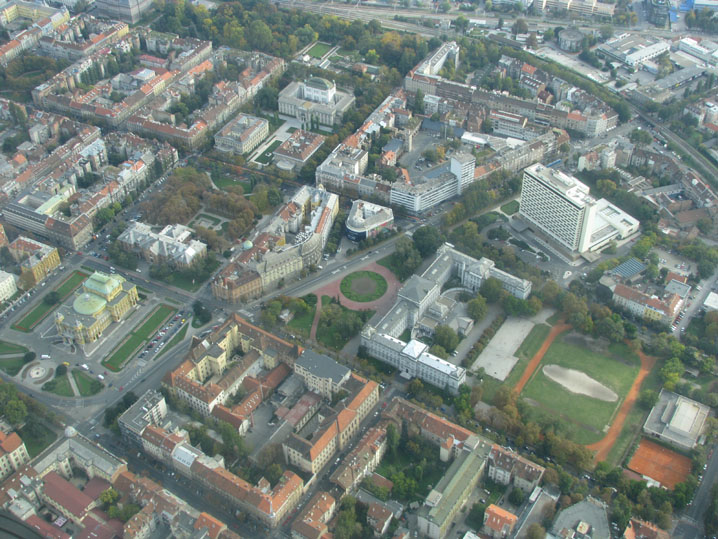
Areal view of Westin Zagreb and other parts of Lower town

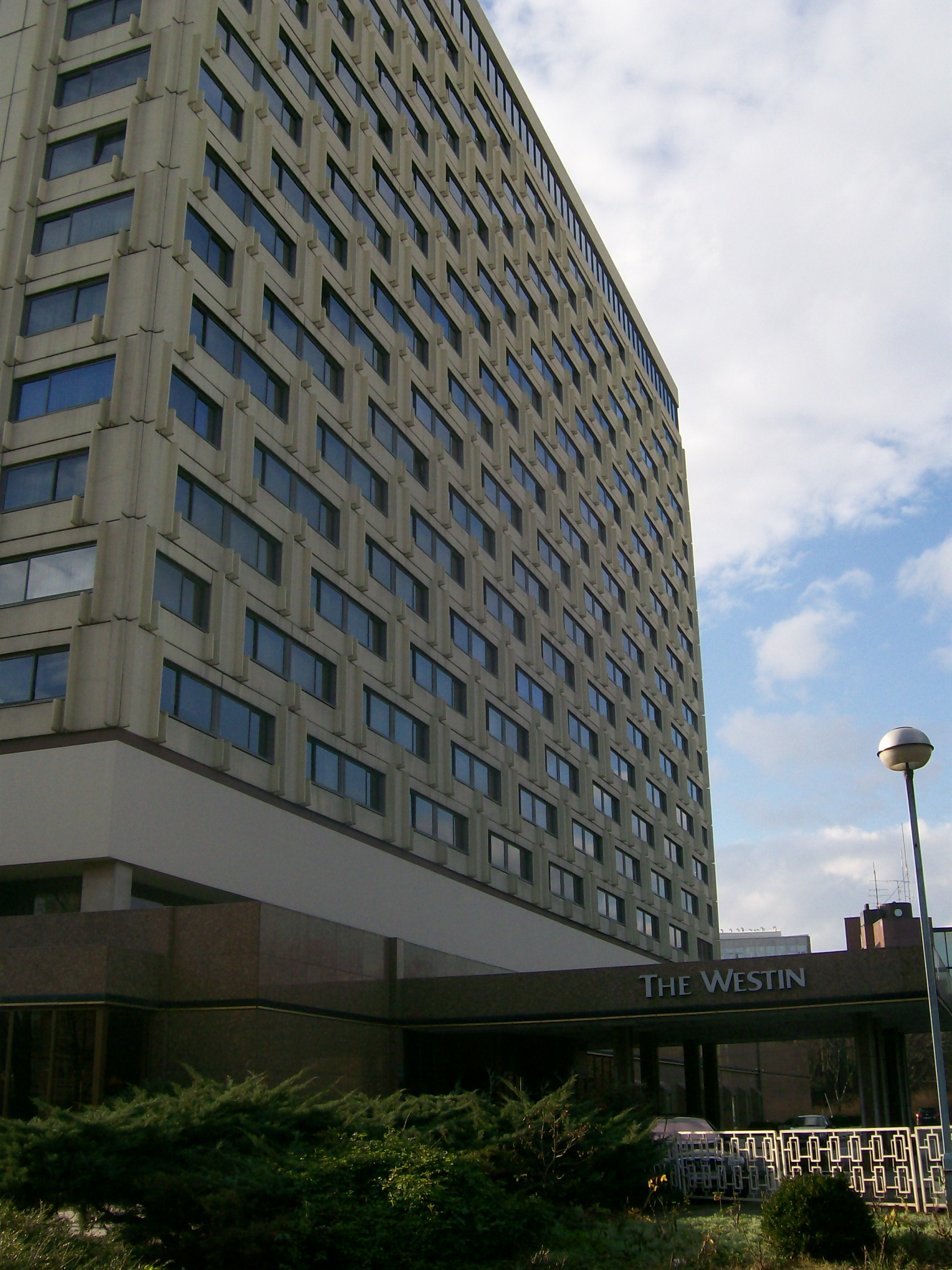
Hotel entrance

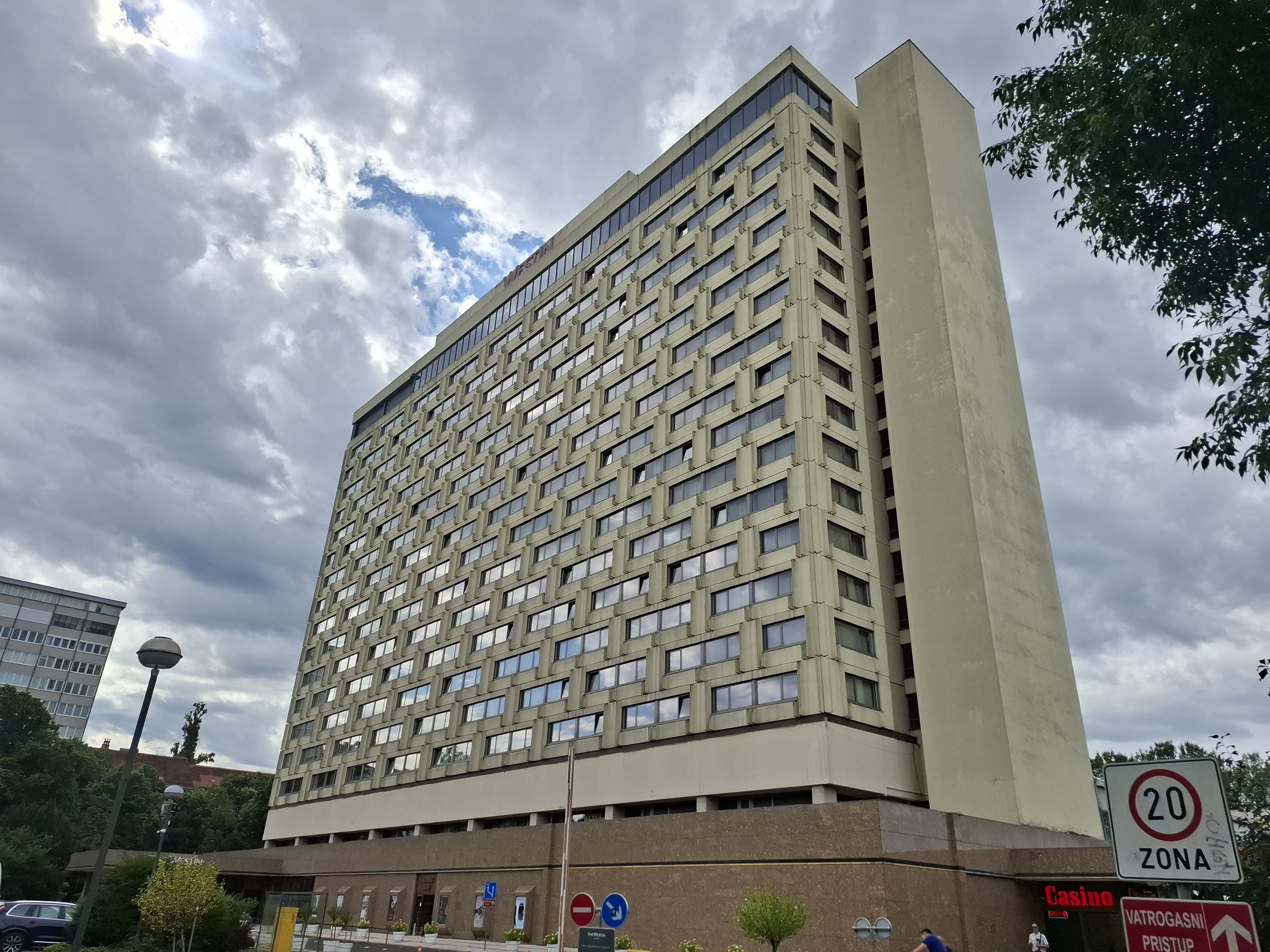
East view

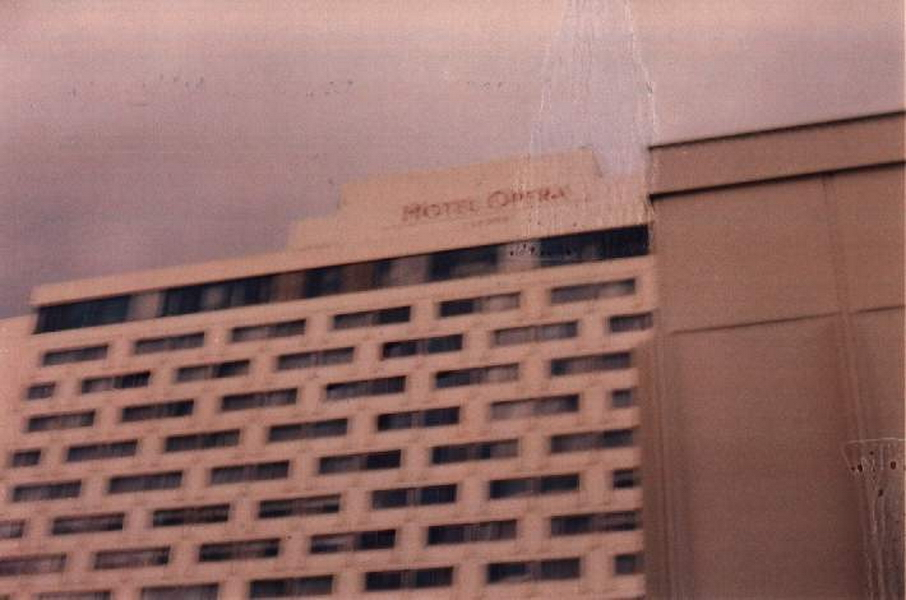
Former “Opera” hotel

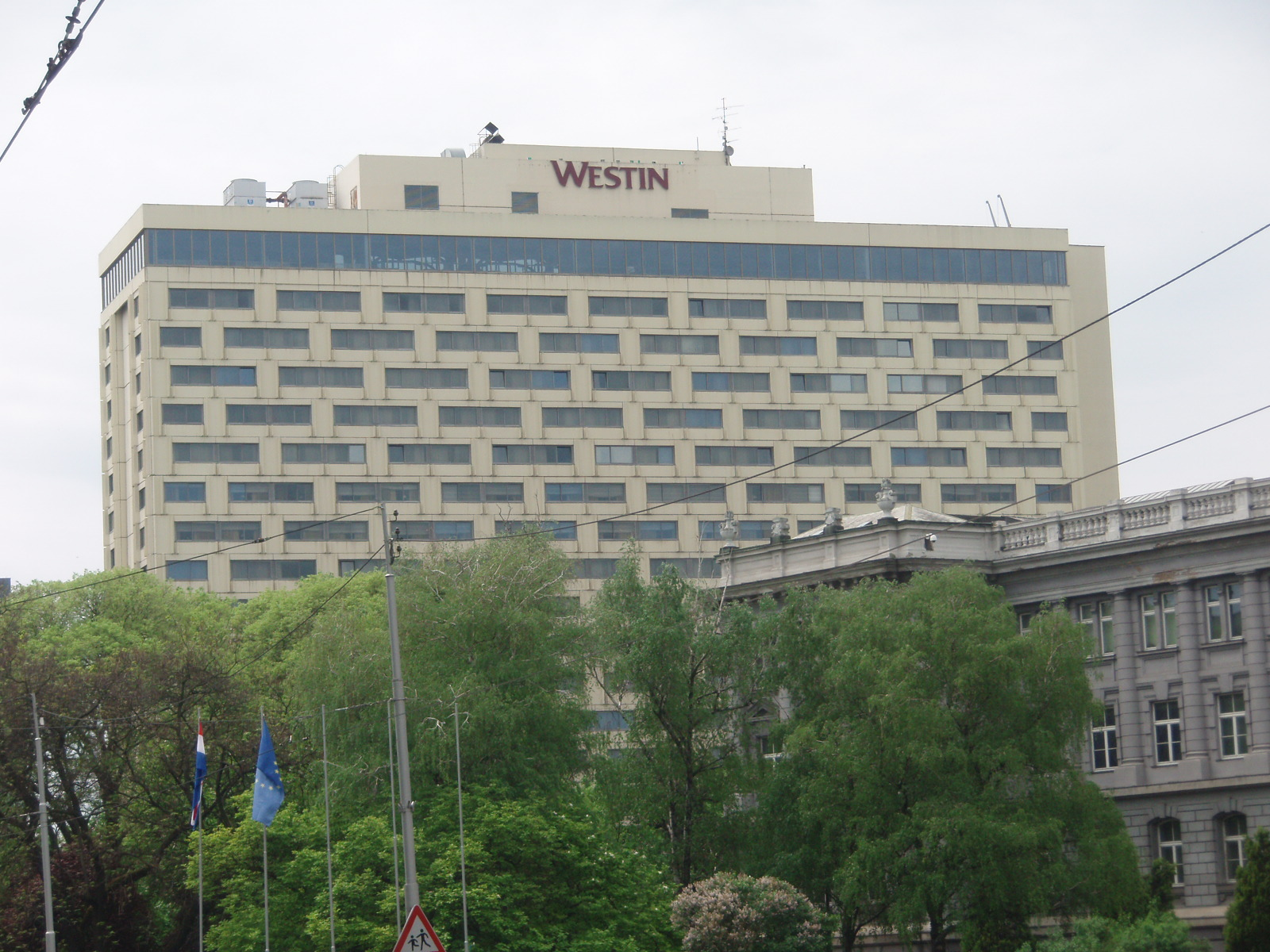
Westin Zagreb behind Mimara Museum

== See also ==
- Mimara Museum
- Zagreb
- Tallest buildings in Croatia
- Westin Hotels & Resorts
