= Aleksandar Ljahnicky =

Croatian architect and visual artist

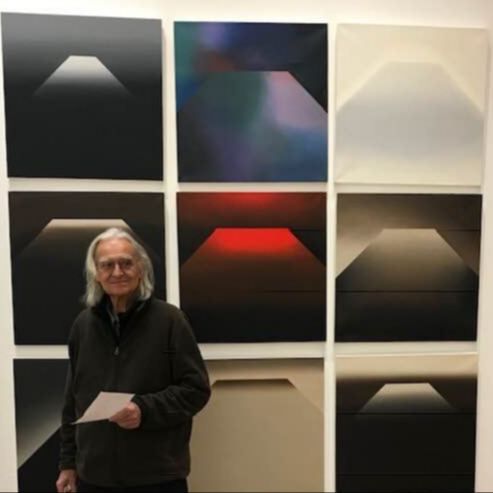
- Aleksandar Ljahnicky, solo exhibition in New York City, January 2019
- Born: 2 December 1933 (age 92); Oklaj, Šibenik, Croatia
- Education: University of Zagreb
- Occupation: Architect

Aleksandar Ljahnicky is an architect and visual artist. He was born in Croatia where he lived until 1995 when he moved to the United States. He became a U.S. citizen and currently lives and works in New York City. Working in architecture, Aleksandar Ljahnicky specialised at international pavilion design architecture, graphic design, and stage design. He exhibited his paintings internationally in museums and galleries.

== Education and work ==
Aleksandar Ljahnicky was born in 1933 in Oklaj, near Šibenik, in Croatia. In 1958 he graduated from the Faculty of Architecture at the University of Zagreb. From 1953 to 1958 he studied art and stage-design with Professor Kamilo Tompa, at the Academy of Dramatic Arts in Zagreb. His early work in graphic design (1958) was awarded and is part of the permanent collection of the Museum of Arts and Crafts in Zagreb and presently included in the European Union digital platforms for European cultural heritage. It was also presented during the Croatian design retrospective exhibition "Design in the City" in Zagreb in 2019. From 1957 until 2000 Aleksandar Ljahnicky works extensively in design of national pavilions throughout the world. From 1970 until 1987 he worked as a TV production designer at the Television Zagreb as well as at OZEHA (Croatian Advertising Institute). Aleksandar Ljahnicky's project for the unbuilt Museum in Čazma has been a topic of research and discussion. His summer stage sculpture created in 1988 is one of the attractions in Maksimir park. In 1994, in Japan, he received the Grand Prix award for urban sculpture.

Aleksandar Ljahnicky has been exhibiting his artwork since the early 1990s. Among others, in 1993 he had a solo exhibition under the name of New York 2 in the Paulina Riehoff Gallery in NYC and at the NYU. In 1994 in cooperation with Croatian-American society his work was presented in Mimara Museum. In 1998 his solo exhibitions was held in Klovicevi Dvori gallery in Zagreb. Fascinated with Mount Fuji, Ljahnicky made a series of paintings and triptychs, intended as an Homage to Mount Fuji, and presented them at his solo exhibition at Tenri Cultural Institute in New York City in 2019. Many of his works are in private collections.
