= Donji grad, Zagreb =

Donji grad
- District of Zagreb
- Gradska četvrt Donji grad
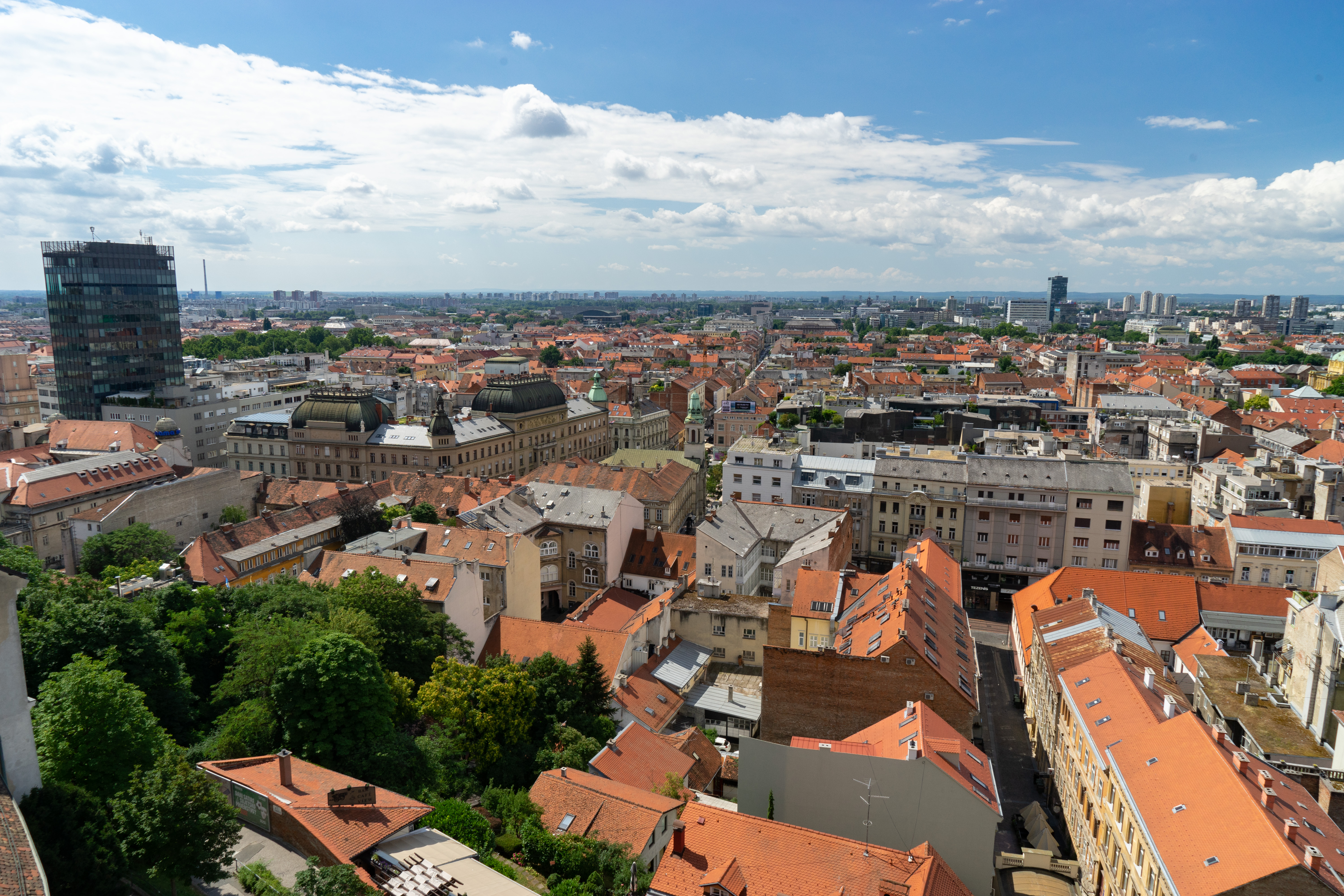
- Donji grad ("Lower town") seen from Lotrščak Tower

- Location of Donji Grad within Zagreb, shown in red.
- Interactive map of Donji grad
- Coordinates: 45°48′30″N 15°58′34″E
- Country: Croatia
- County: City of Zagreb
- Modern district founded: 14 December 1999

Government
  - Council President: Petar Paradžik (SDP)
  - District Council: 15 members: SDP, HNS, NH-PS (5); ZJN, NL, ORaH, RF, ZG (3); HDZ (3); Ind. S. Švaljek, HSLS (2); BM 365, ZL, NS-R (2)

Area
  - Total: 3.016 km^{2} (1.164 sq mi)

Population (2011)
  - Total: 37,024
  - Density: 12,280/km^{2} (31,790/sq mi)

Donji grad (pronounced [dôːɲiː grâːd], locally also [ˈdoʎɲi grad], lit. 'Lower Town' (Note: Contrasted to Gornji grad, lit. "Upper town")) is one of the 17 city districts of Zagreb, the capital of Croatia. It is located in the central part of the city and has 37,024 inhabitants (as of 2011). The district is often referred to simply as centar (lit. 'center') by Zagreb residents, a term which also encompasses the southern parts of the Gornji Grad district.

== Gallery ==
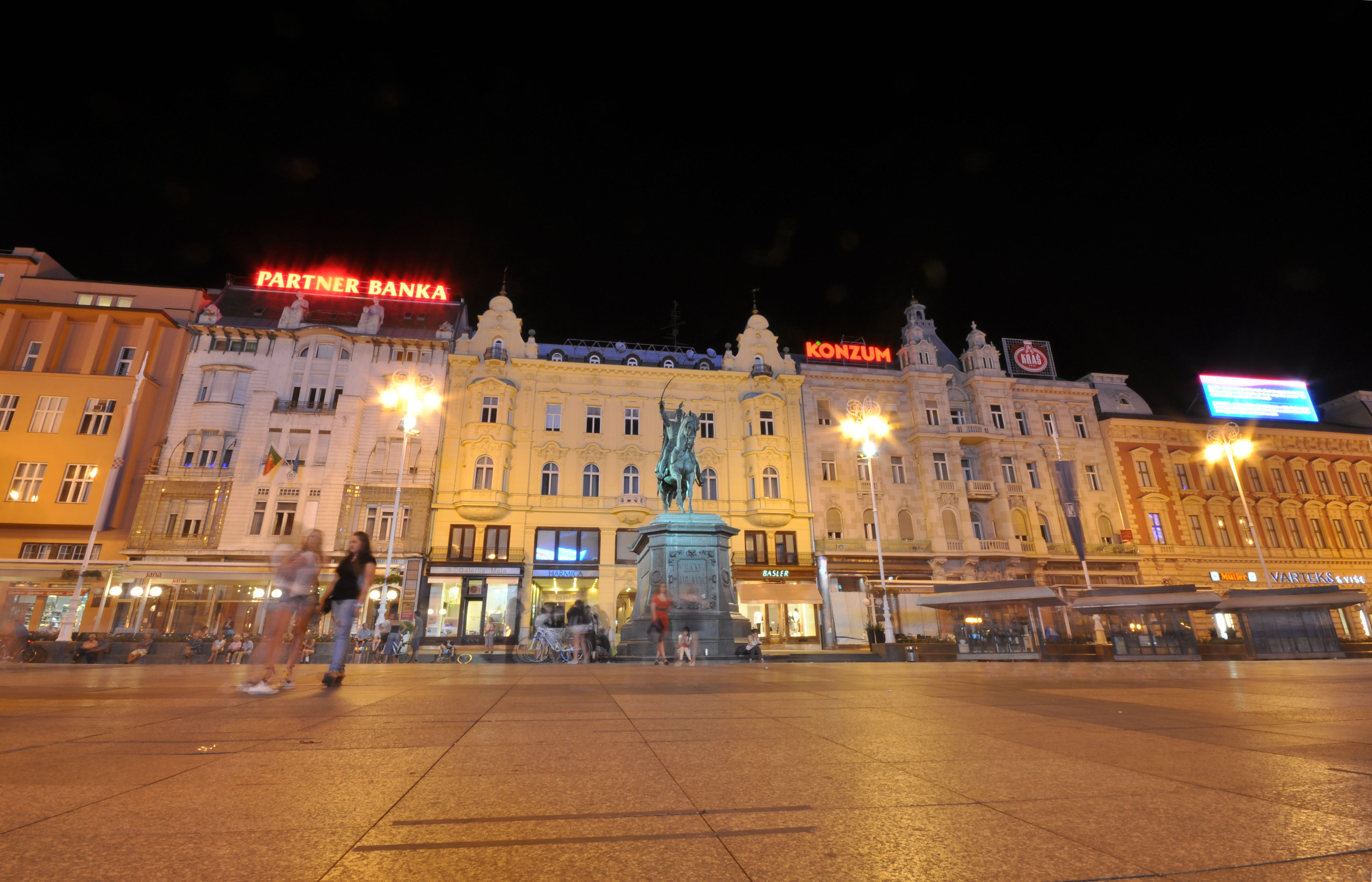
Ban Jelačić Square

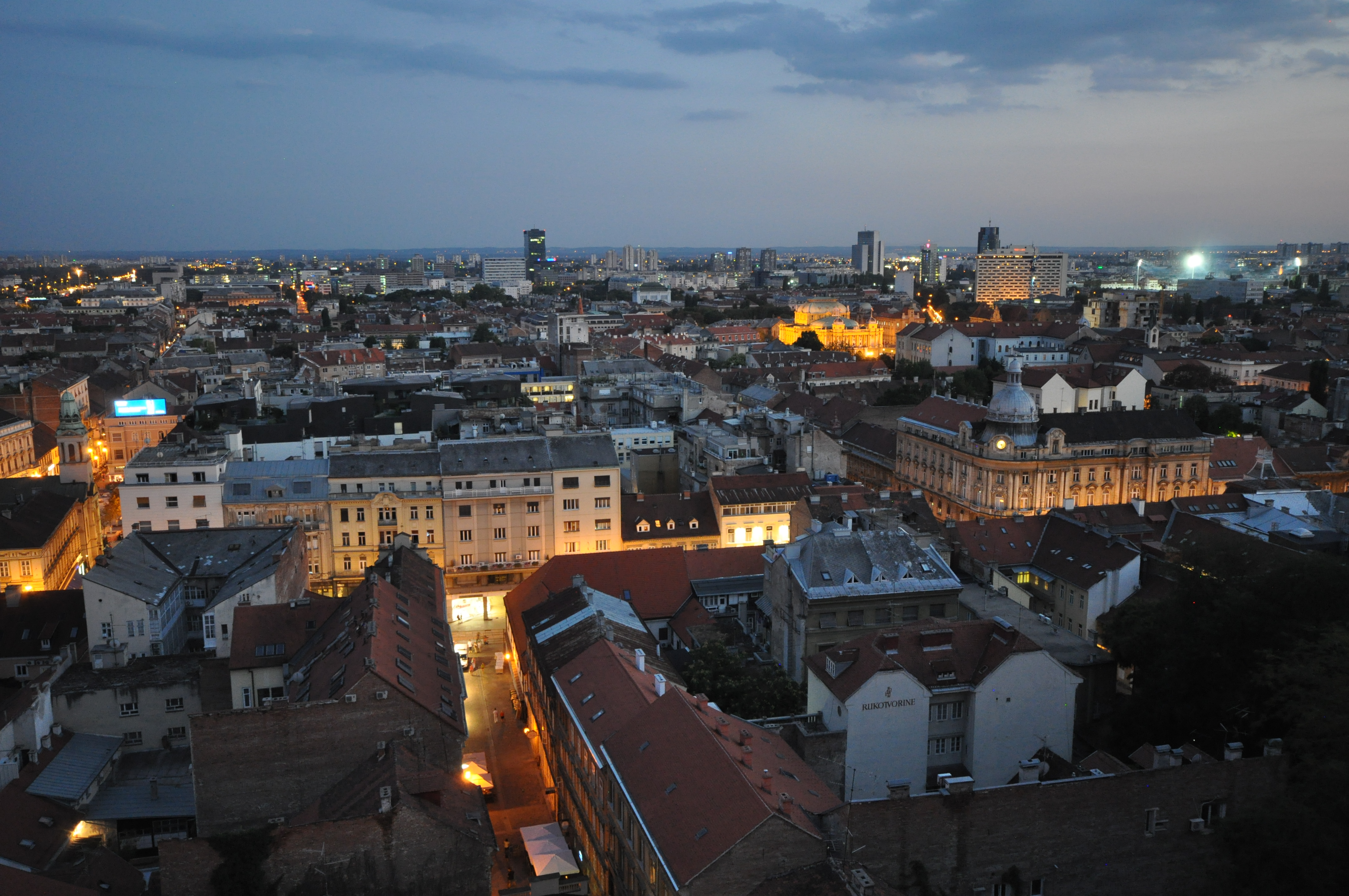
Donji grad at dawn

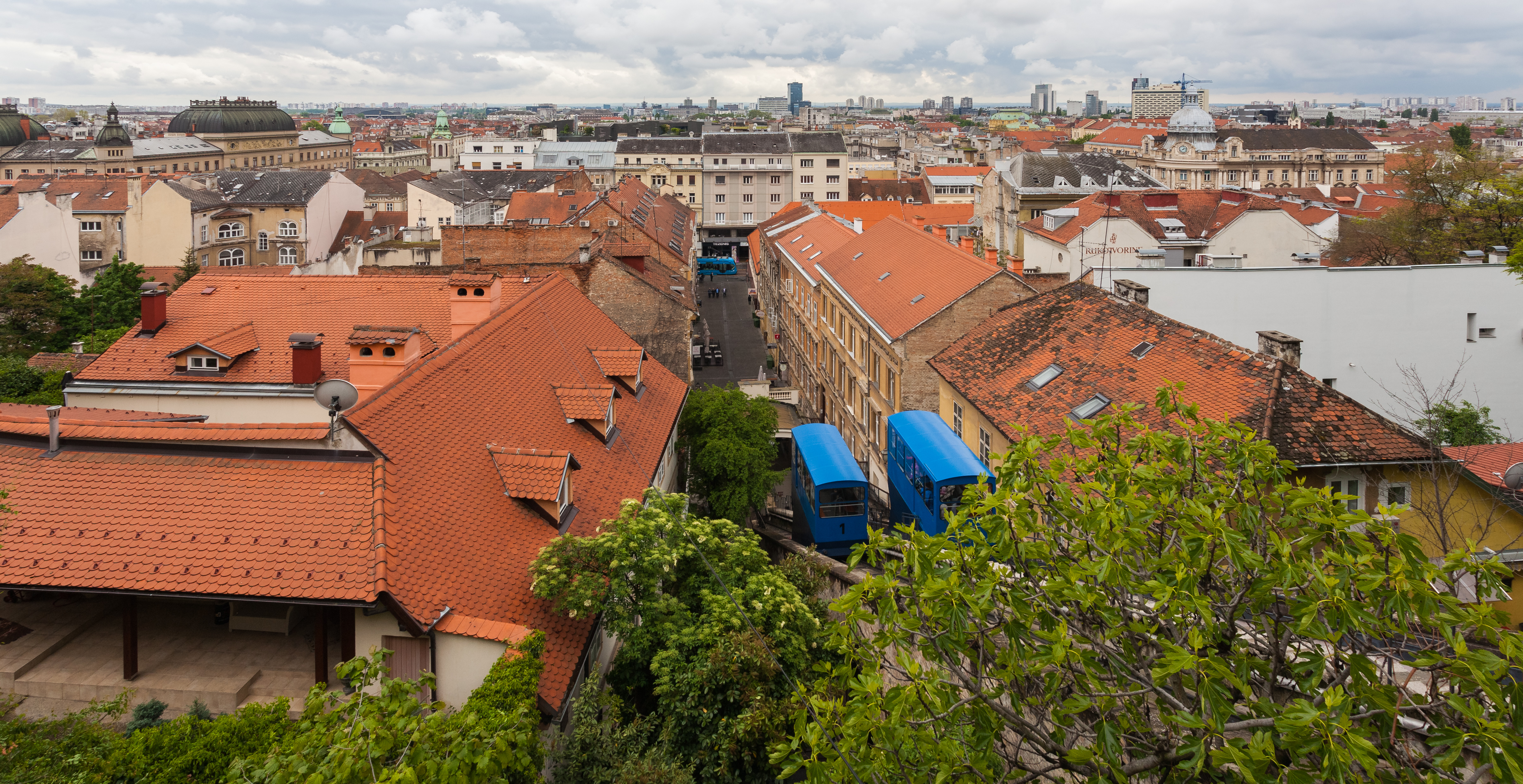
Donji grad skyline

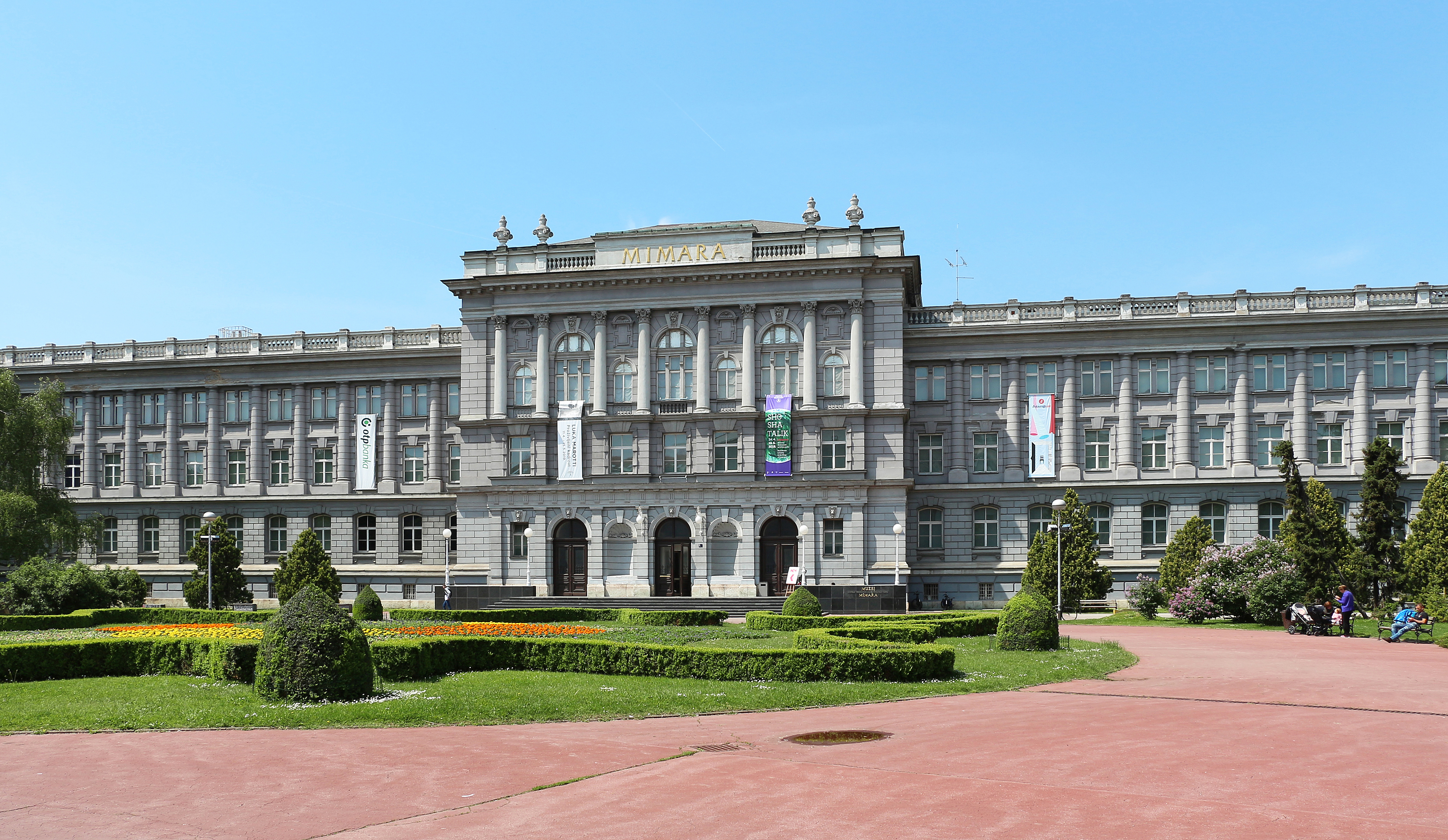
Mimara Museum

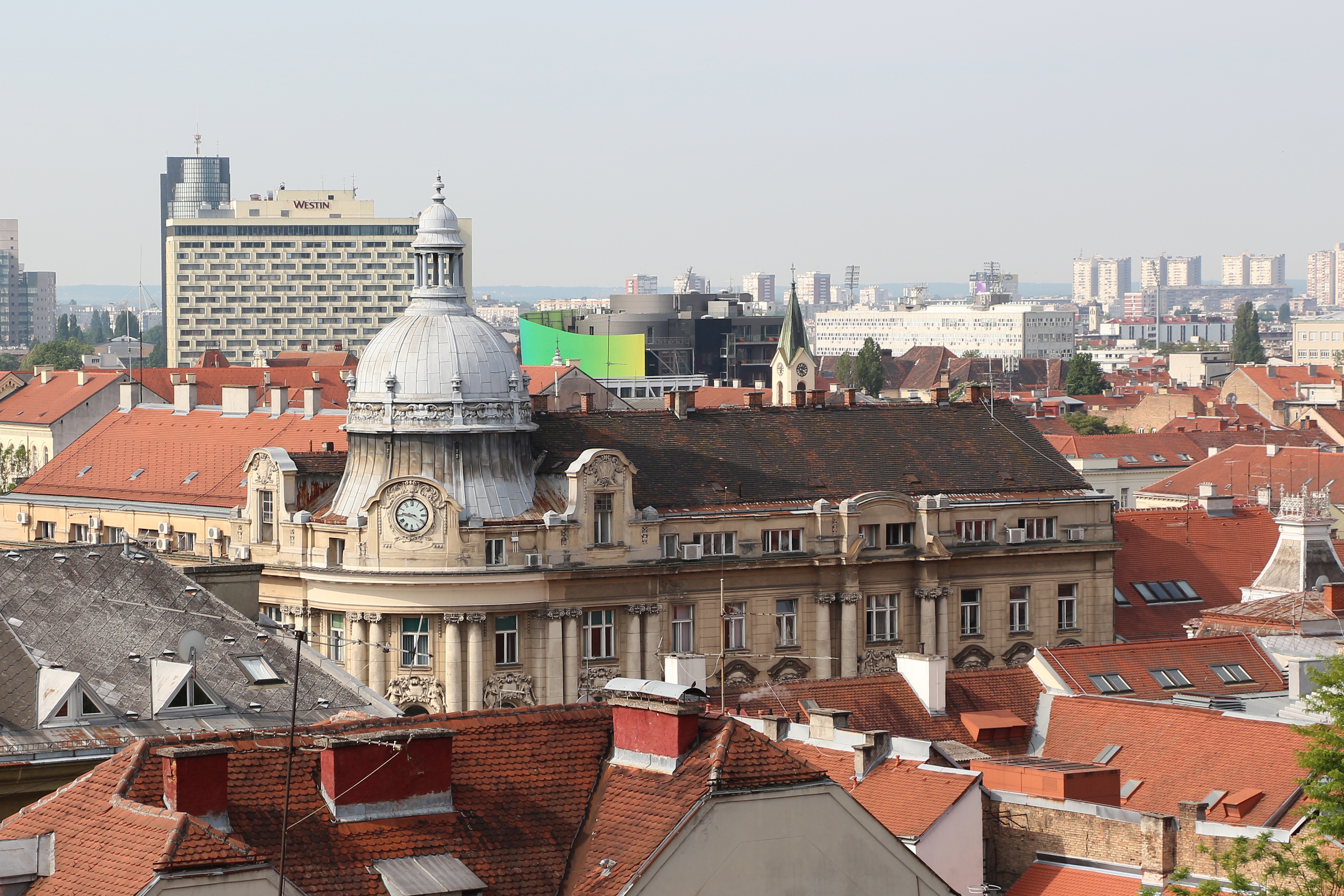
Regional office of the city administration center

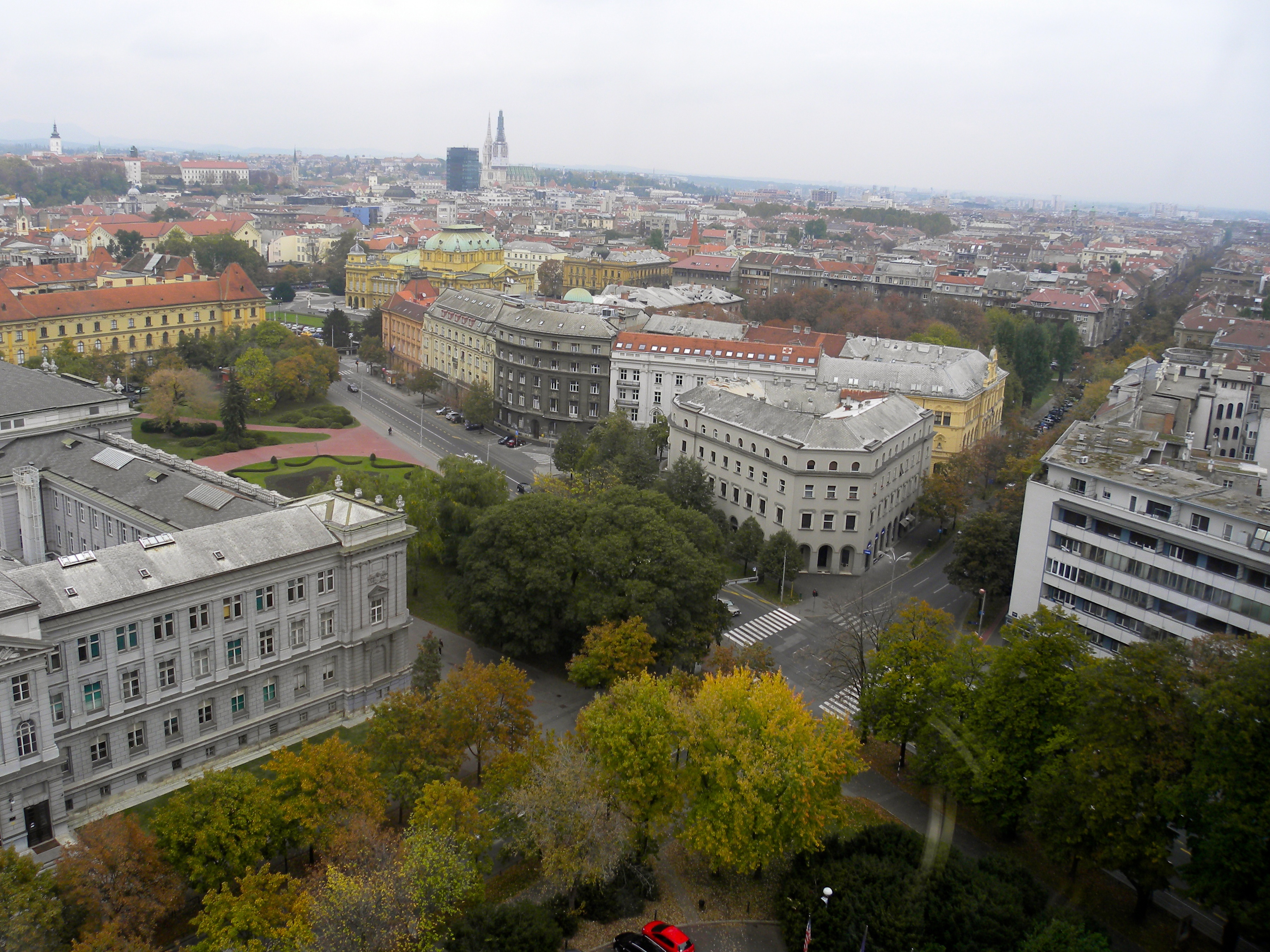
View from The Westin Zagreb

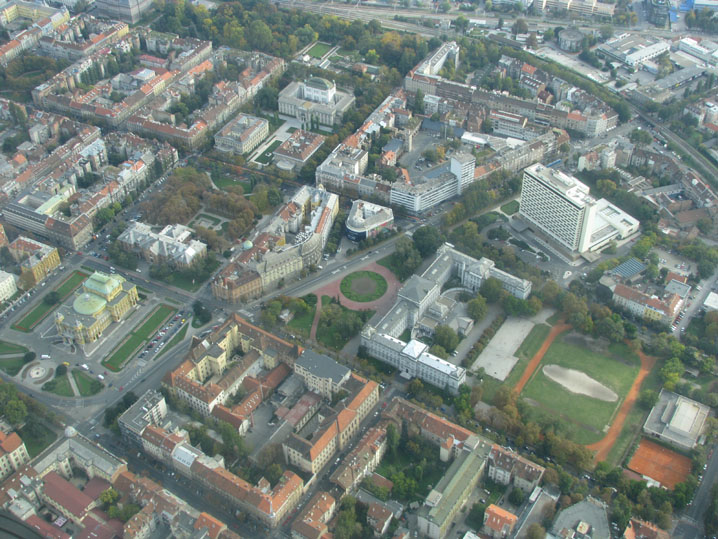
Areal view of the Westin, Mimara Museum, the buildings of the Croatian Journalists' Association, Croatian National Theater, Croatian State Archives and other parts of Donji grad near Savska Road
