= Korušce =

- Village
- Location within Split-Dalmatia County Location within Croatia
- Coordinates: 43°37′59″N 16°22′59″E
- Country: Croatia
- Region: Dalmatia
- County: Split-Dalmatia County
- Municipality: Klis

Area
  - Total: 12.3 km^{2} (4.7 sq mi)
- Elevation: 439 m (1,440 ft)

Population (2021)
  - Total: 78
  - Density: 6.3/km^{2} (16/sq mi)
- Time zone: UTC+1 (CET)
  - Summer (DST): UTC+2 (CEST)
- Postal code: 21202
- Area code: 021

Korušce is a village in the Split-Dalmatia County, Croatia. The settlement is administered as a part of Klis municipality. According to national census of 2011, population of the settlement was 80.
