= Zagreb =

Capital city and county in Croatia

- Capital city and county
- Grad Zagreb; City of Zagreb
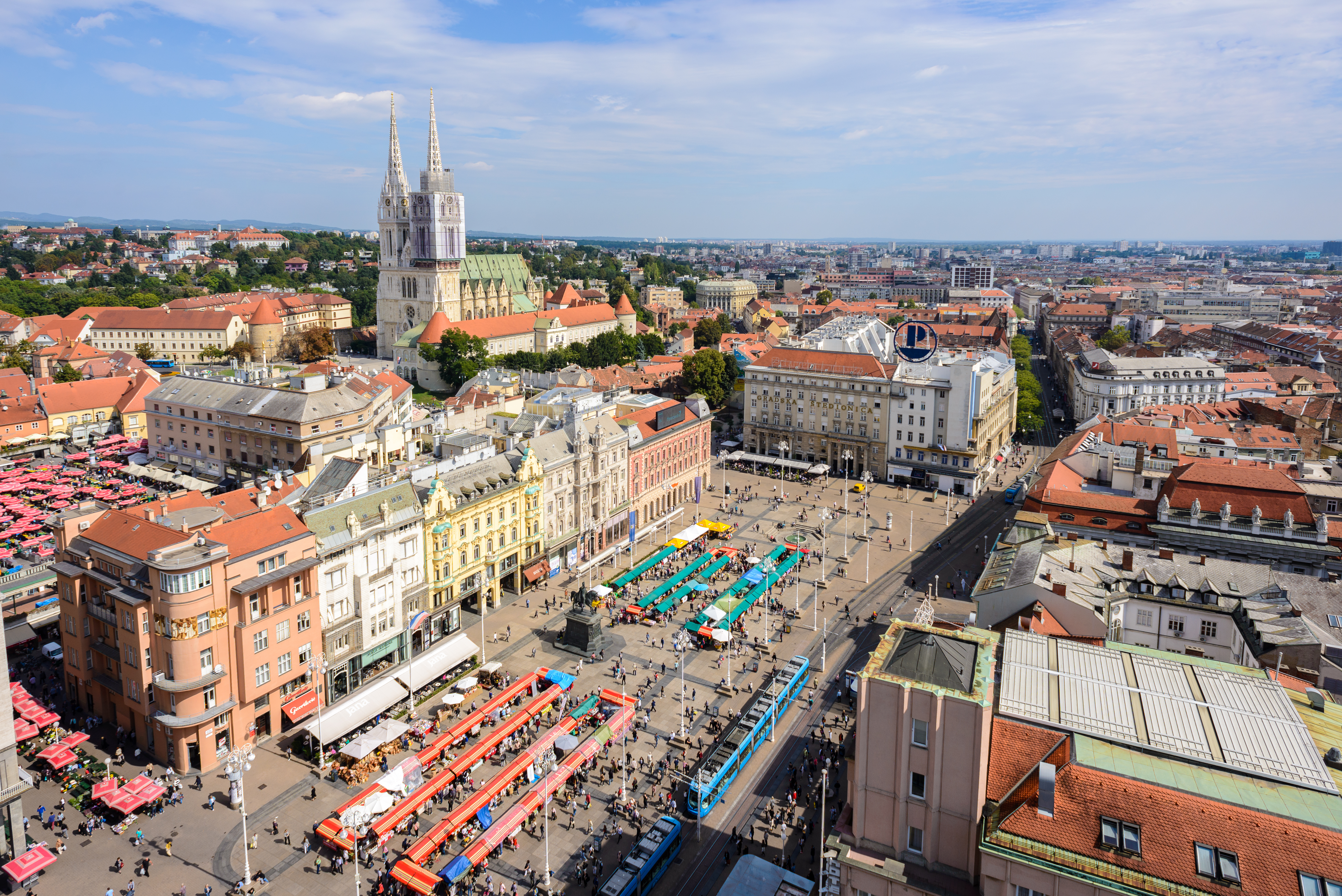
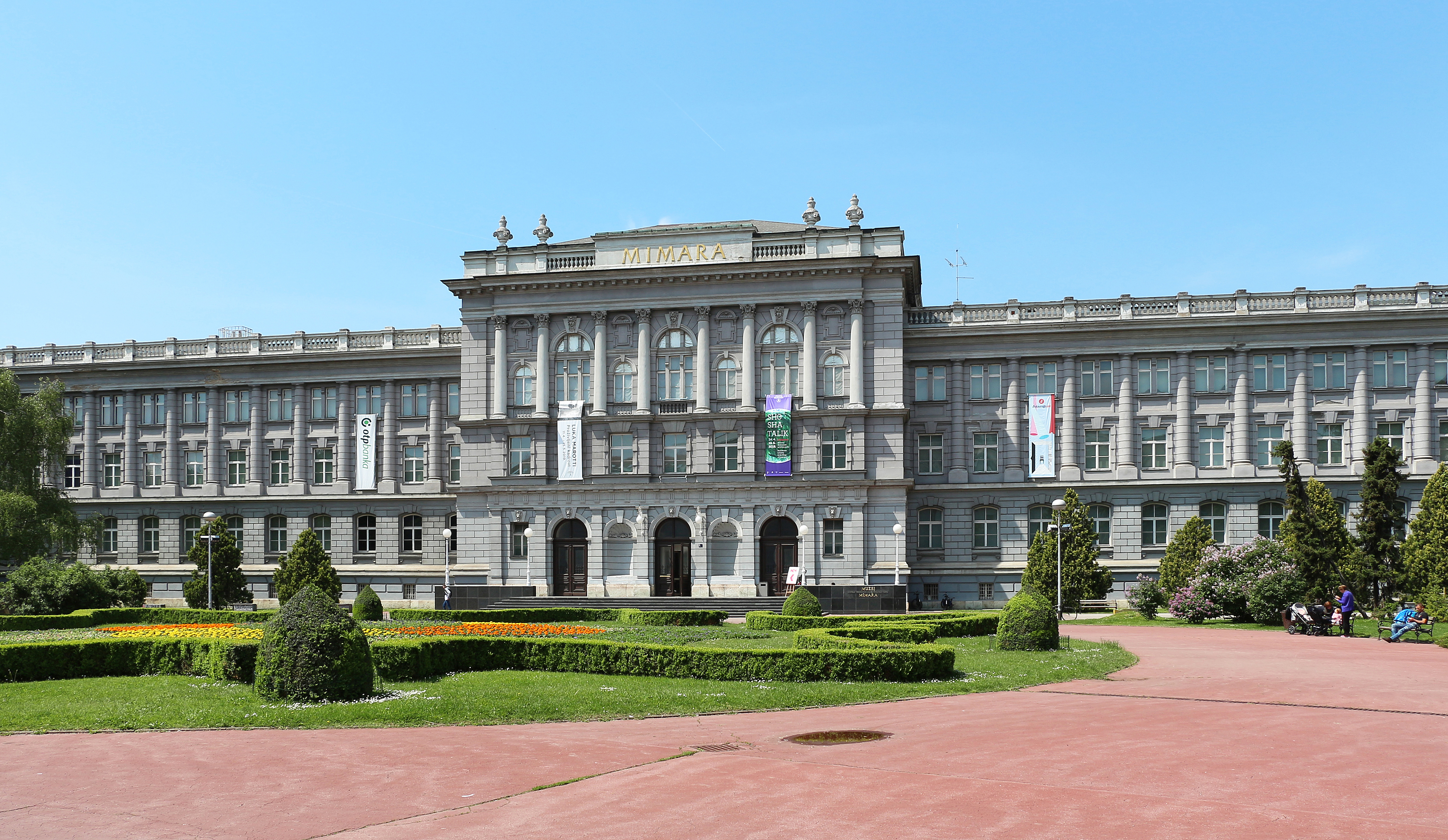
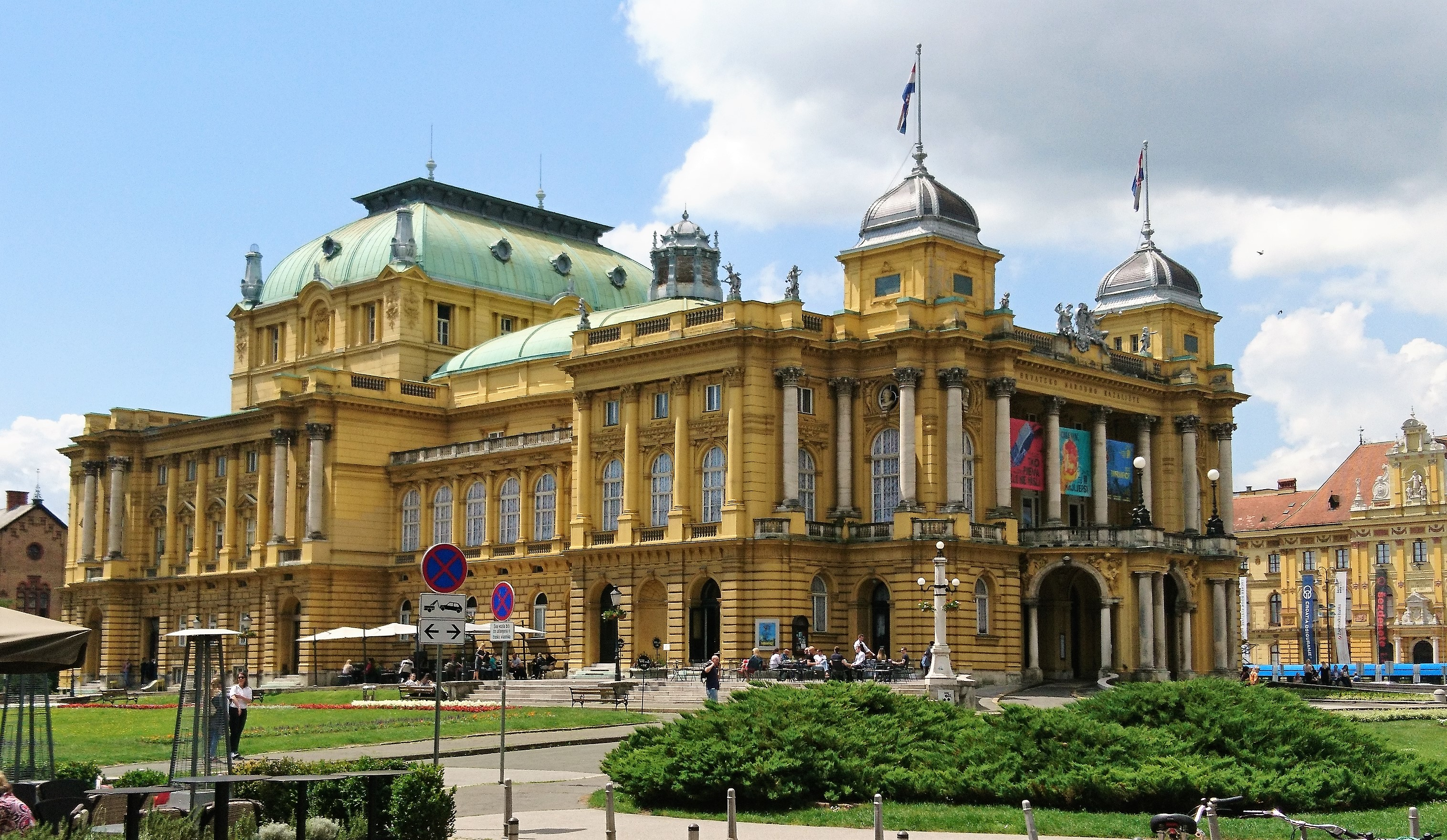
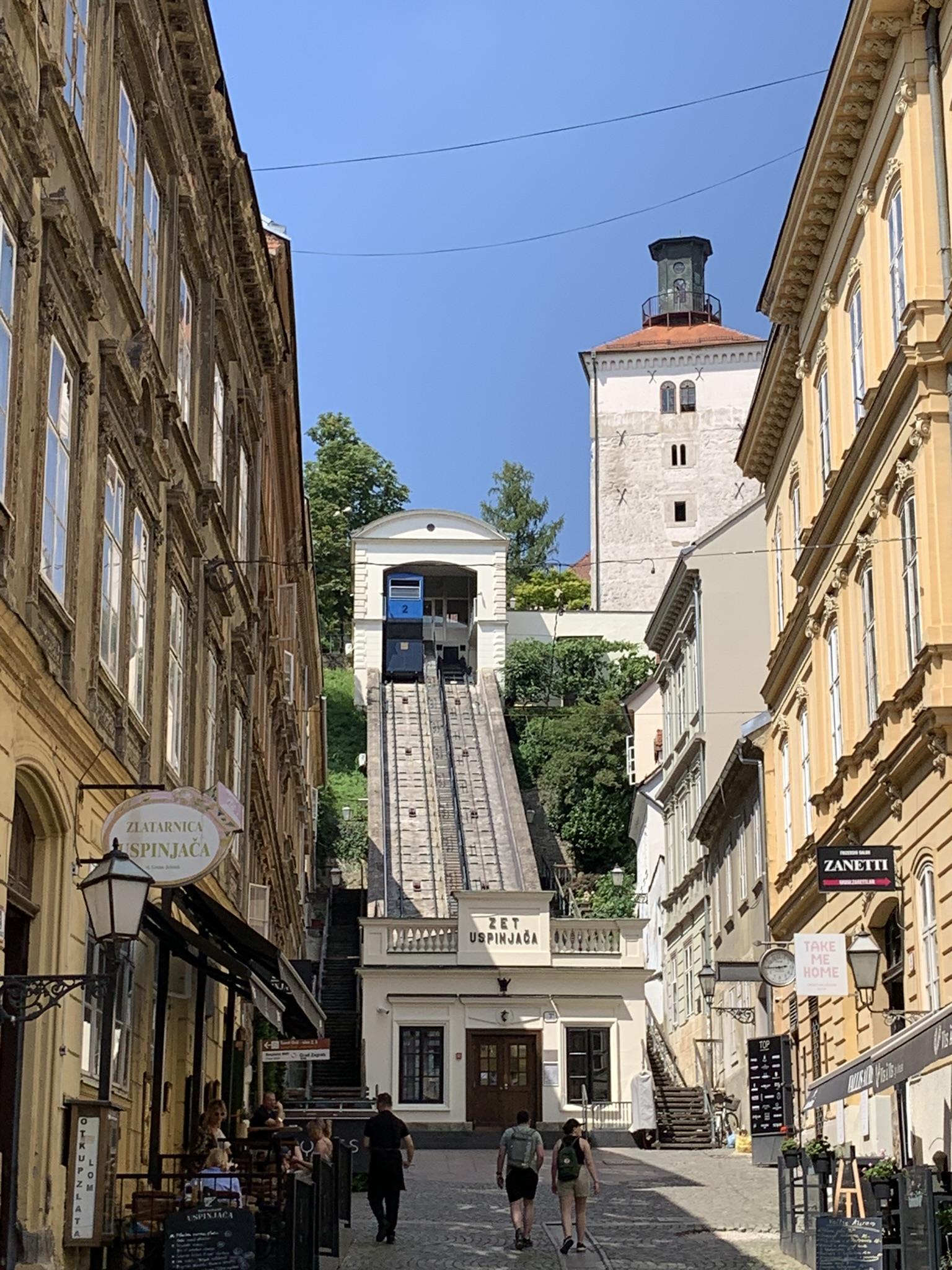
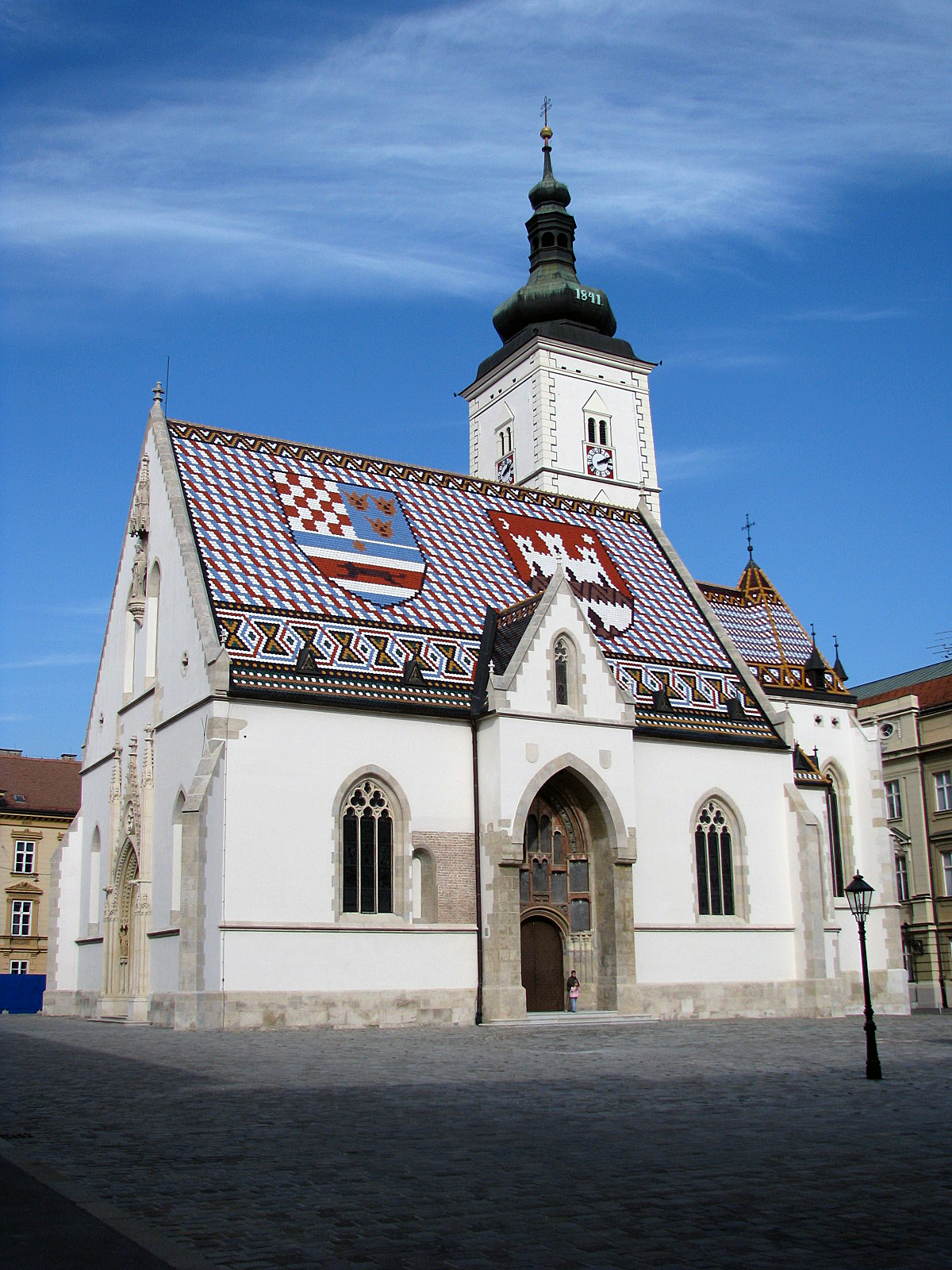
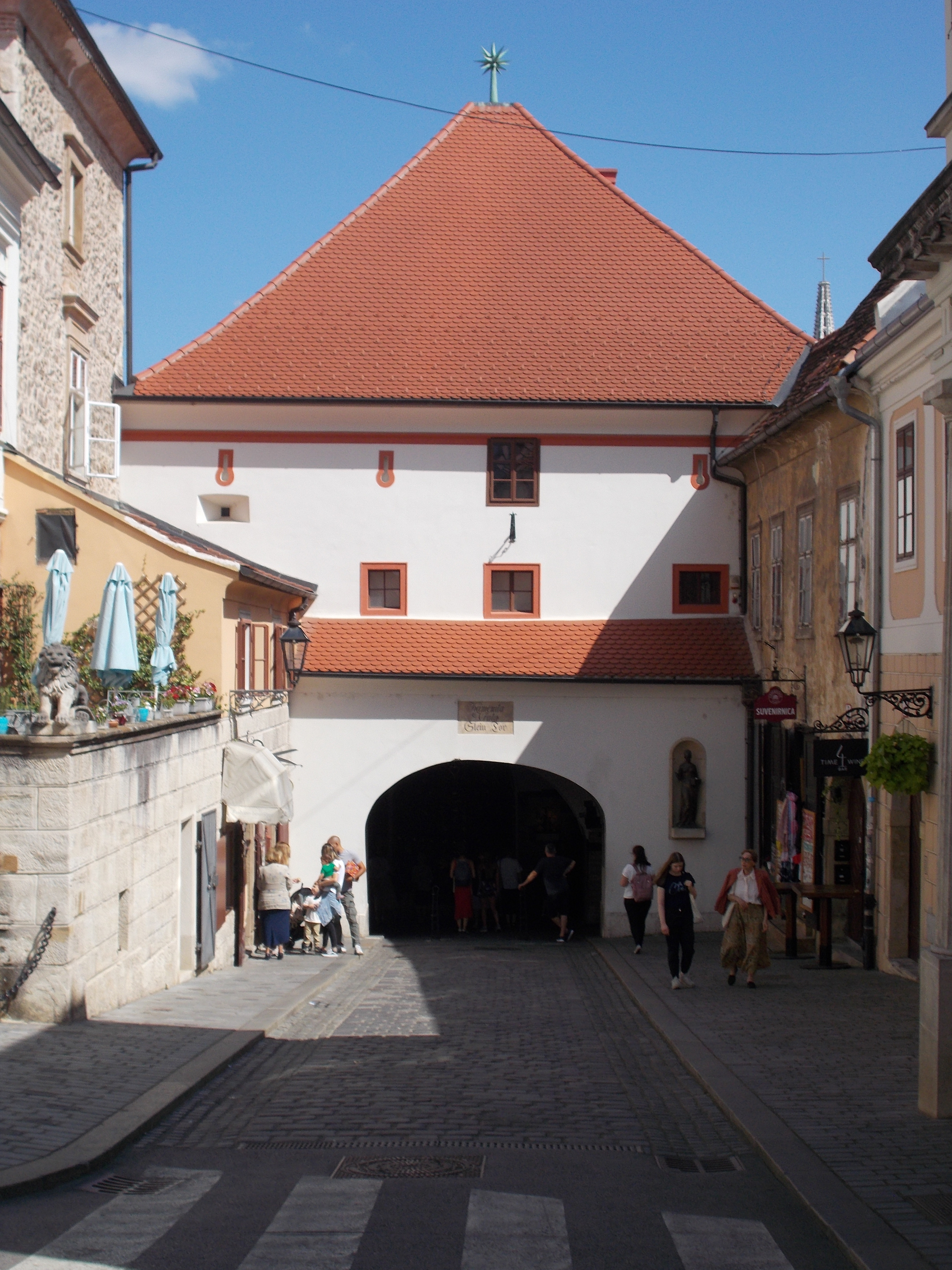
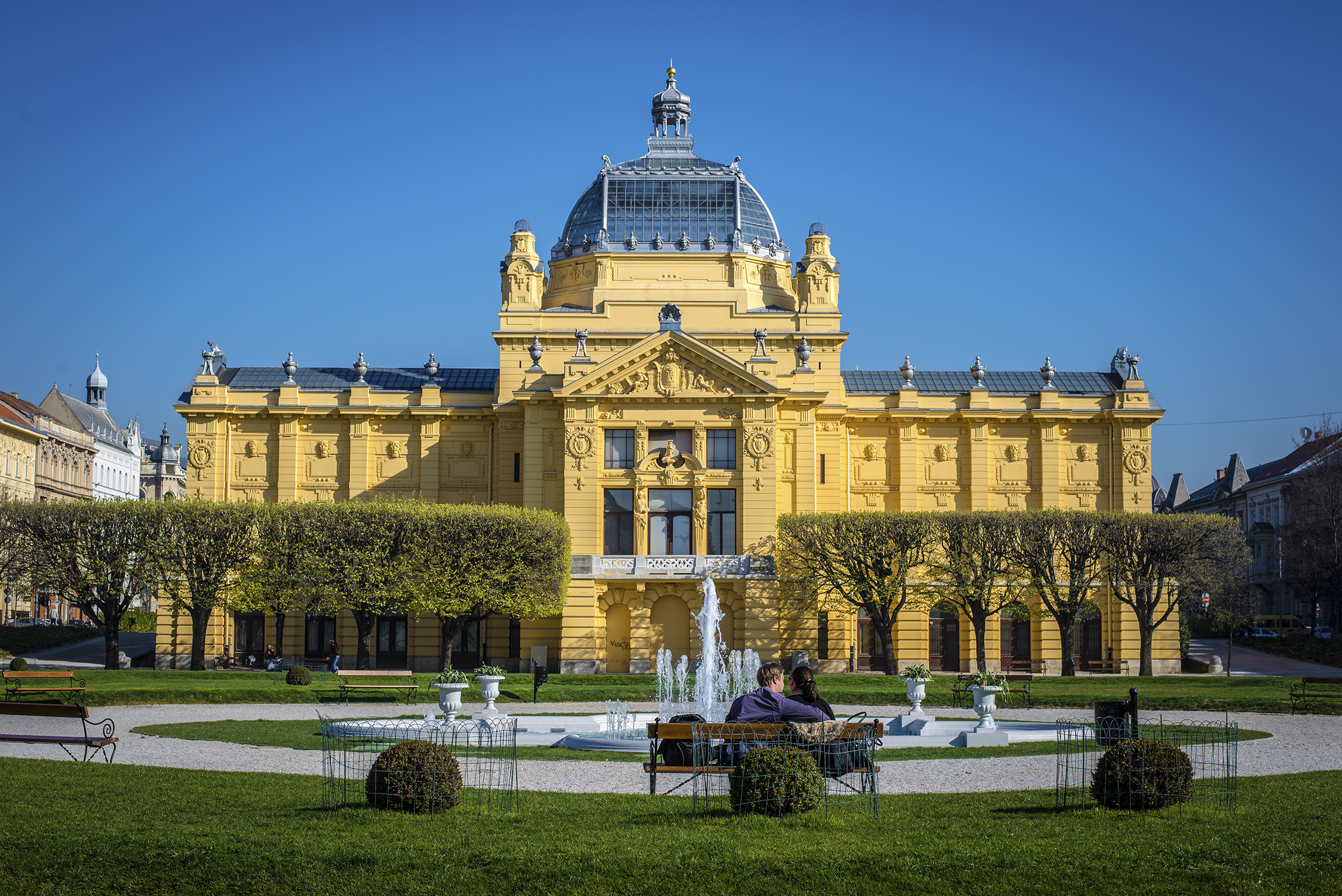
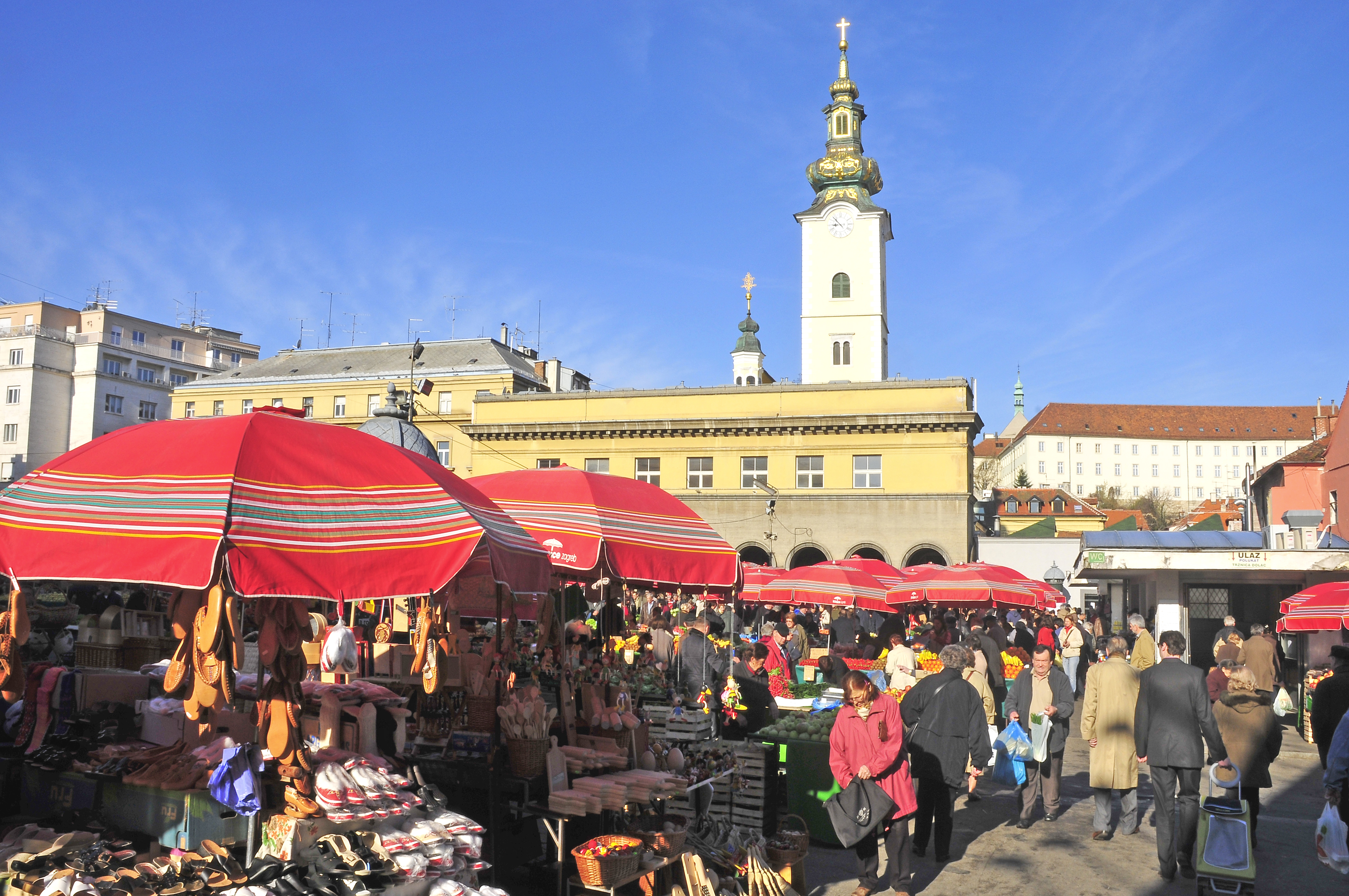
- Ban Jelačić Square with Zagreb Cathedral Mimara Museum Croatian National Theatre Funicular and Lotrščak Tower St. Mark's Church Stone Gate in Upper Town Art Pavilion Dolac Market

- Flag Coat of arms

- The city of Zagreb in Croatia
- Interactive map of Zagreb
- Location within Croatia Location within Europe
- Coordinates: 45°48′47″N 15°58′39″E
- Country: Croatia
- Region: Central Croatia (Prigorje, Posavina)
- County: City of Zagreb
- RC diocese: 1094
- Free royal city: 1242
- Unified: 1850
- Subdivisions: 17 city districts 218 local committees 70 settlements

Government
  - Type: Mayor-Council
  - Mayor: Tomislav Tomašević (M!)
  - City Assembly: 47 members: We Can! & SDP (25); HDZ & DP (8); Marija Selak Raspudić (7); Servus Zagreb (4); Independent List of Tomislav Jonjić (3)

Area
  - City: 641.2 km^{2} (247.6 sq mi)
  - Urban: 305.8 km^{2} (118.1 sq mi)
- Elevation: 158 m (518 ft)
- Highest elevation: 1,035 m (3,396 ft)
- Lowest elevation: 122 m (400 ft)

Population (2021)
  - City: 767,131
  - Density: 1,196/km^{2} (3,099/sq mi)
  - Urban: 663,592
  - Urban density: 2,170/km^{2} (5,620/sq mi)
  - Metro: 1,086,528
- Demonym(s): Zagreber (en); Zagrepčanin (hr, male); Zagrepčanka (hr, female); Purger (informal, jargon)

GDP
  - City: €29.117 billion (2024)
  - Per capita: €37,474 (2024)
- Time zone: UTC+01:00 (CET)
  - Summer (DST): UTC+02:00 (CEST)
- Postal code: HR-10 000, HR-10 010, HR-10 020, HR-10040
- Area code: +385 1
- International Airport: Zagreb Franjo Tuđman Airport (ZAG)
- HDI (2023): 0.954 very high · 1st
- Website: zagreb.hr

Historical Affiliations

Kingdom of Croatia (925–1102)
Kingdom of Croatia (Note: In personal union with Hungary) (1102–1526)
Habsburg Monarchy (1527–1804)
Austrian Empire (1804–1867)
Austria-Hungary (1867–1918)
State of Slovenes, Croats and Serbs (1918)
Kingdom of Yugoslavia (Note: Known as: Kingdom of Serbs, Croats and Slovenes (1918–1929)) (1918–1941)
Independent State of Croatia (1941–1945; capital)
SFR Yugoslavia (Note: Known as: Federal People's Republic of Yugoslavia (1945–1963); Socialist Federal Republic of Yugoslavia (1963–1992)) (1945–1991)
Croatia (1991–present; capital)

Zagreb (/ˈzɑːɡrɛb/ ZAH-greb; Croatian: [zǎːɡreb] (Note: Kajkavian pronunciation: [ˈzagrep])) is the capital and largest city of Croatia. It is in the north of the country, along the Sava River, at the southern slopes of the Medvednica mountain. Zagreb stands near the international border between Croatia and Slovenia at an elevation of approximately 158 m (518 ft) above sea level. At the 2021 census, the city itself had a population of 767,131, while the population of the Zagreb metropolitan area is 1,086,528.

The oldest settlement in the vicinity of the city was the Roman Andautonia, in today's Šćitarjevo. The historical record of the name "Zagreb" dates from 1134, in reference to the foundation of the settlement at Kaptol in 1094. Zagreb became a free royal city in 1242. In 1851, Janko Kamauf became Zagreb's first mayor. Zagreb has special status as a Croatian administrative division—it comprises a consolidated city-county (but separate from Zagreb County), and is administratively subdivided into 17 city districts. Most of the city districts lie at a low elevation along the valley of the river Sava, whereas northern and northeastern city districts, such as Podsljeme and Sesvete districts are spread out across the foothills of the Medvednica mountain, making the city's geography rather diverse. The city spans about 30 km from east to west, while stretching about 20 km from north to south. Zagreb ranks as a global city, with a 'Beta-' rating from the Globalization and World Cities Research Network.

The transport connections, concentration of industry, and scientific and research institutions and industrial tradition underlie Zagreb's leading economic position in Croatia. Zagreb is the seat of the central government, administrative bodies, and almost all government ministries. Almost all of the largest Croatian companies, media, and scientific institutions have their headquarters in the city. Zagreb is the most important transport hub in Croatia: here Central Europe, the Mediterranean and Southeast Europe meet, making the Zagreb area the centre of the road, rail and air networks of Croatia. It is a city known for its diverse economy, high quality of living, museums, sporting, and entertainment events. Major branches of Zagreb's economy include high-tech industries and the service sector.

== Name ==
The etymology of the name Zagreb is unclear. It was used for the united city only from 1852, but it had been in use as the name of the Zagreb Diocese since the 12th century and was increasingly used for the city in the 17th century. The name is first recorded in a charter by Felician, Archbishop of Esztergom, dated 1134, mentioned as Zagrabiensem episcopatum.

The name is probably derived from Proto-Slavic word *grębъ which means "hill" or "uplift". An Old Croatian reconstructed name Zagrębъ is manifested through the city's former German name, Agram. Some linguists (e.g. Nada Klaić, Miroslav Kravar) propose a metathesis of *Zabreg, which would originate from Old Slavic breg (see Proto-Slavic *bergъ) in the sense of "riverbank", referring to River Sava. This metathesis has been attested in Kajkavian, but the meaning of "riverbank" is lost in modern Croatian and folk etymology associates it instead with breg "hill", ostensibly referring to Medvednica. Hungarian linguist Gyula Décsy similarly uses metathesis to construct *Chaprakov(o), a putative Slavicisation of a Hungarian hypocorism for "Cyprian", similar to the etymology of Csepreg, Hungary. The most likely derivation is *Zagrębъ in the sense of "embankment" or "rampart", i.e. remains of the 1st millennium fortifications on Grič.

In Middle Latin and Modern Latin, Zagreb is known as Agranum (the name of an unrelated Arabian city in Strabo), Zagrabia or Mons Graecensis (also Mons Crecensis, in reference to Grič (Gradec)).

The most common folk etymology of the name of the city has been from the verb stem *za-grab-, meaning "to scoop" or "to dig". A folk legend illustrating this derivation, attested but discarded as a serious etymology by Ivan Tkalčić, ties the name to a drought of the early 14th century, during which Augustin Kažotić (c. 1260–1323) is said to have dug a well which miraculously produced water. In another legend, a city governor is thirsty and orders a girl named Manda to "scoop" water from the Manduševac well (nowadays a fountain in Ban Jelačić Square), using the imperative: Zagrabi, Mando! ("Scoop, Manda!").

== History ==
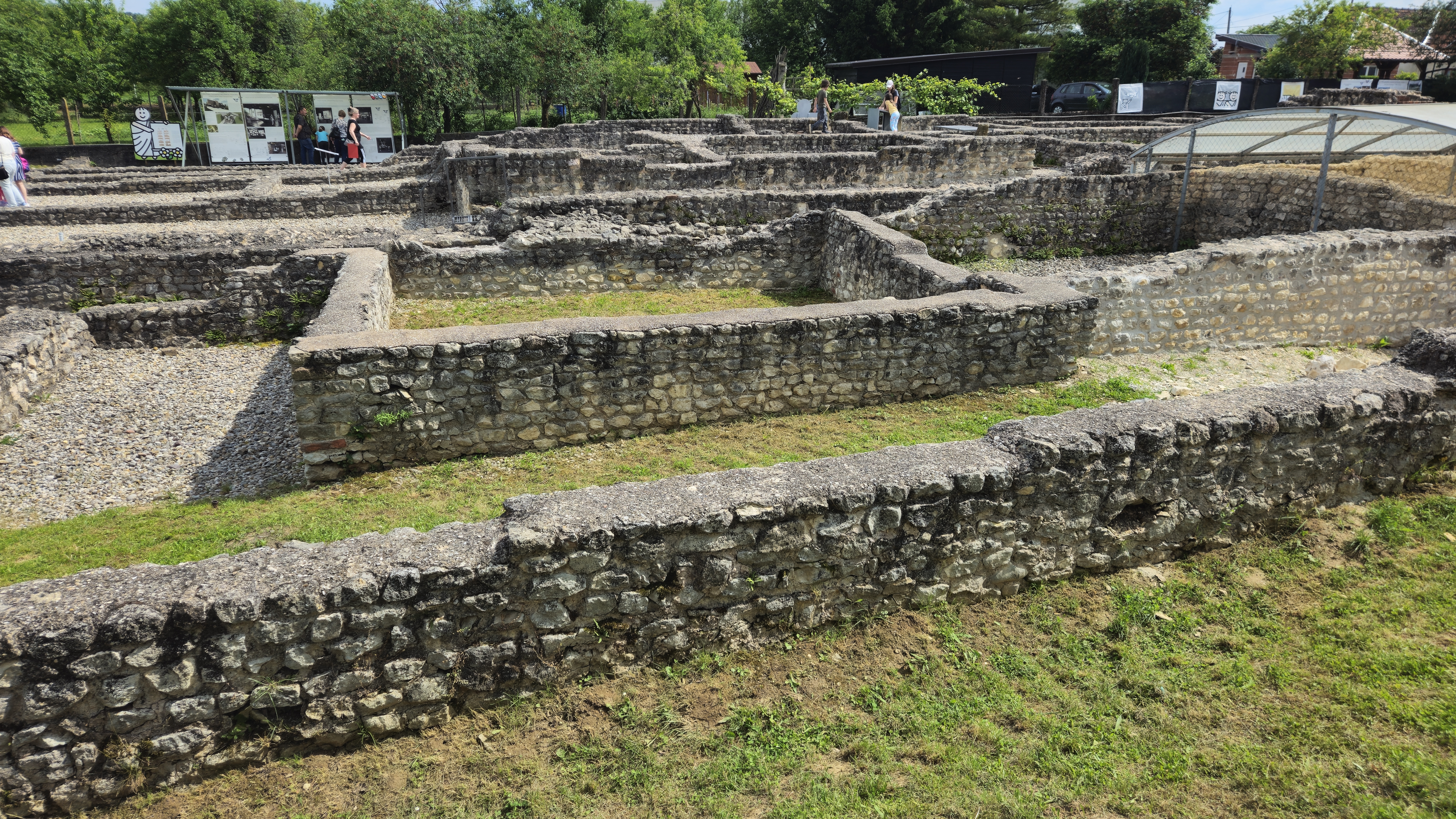
Ruins of the ancient Roman town Andautonia near Zagreb

The oldest known settlement located near present-day Zagreb, the Roman town of Andautonia, now Ščitarjevo, existed between the 1st and the 5th centuries AD.

The first recorded appearance of the name "Zagreb" dates from 1094, at which time the city existed as two different city centres: the smaller, eastern Kaptol, inhabited mainly by clergy and housing Zagreb Cathedral, and the larger, western Gradec, inhabited mainly by craftsmen and merchants. In 1851 the Ban of Croatia, Josip Jelačić, united Gradec and Kaptol; the name of the main city square, Ban Jelačić Square honors him.

While Croatia formed part of Yugoslavia (1918 to 1991), Zagreb remained an important economic centre of that country, and was the second largest city. After Croatia declared independence from Yugoslavia in 1991, the Parliament of the Republic of Croatia proclaimed Zagreb as the capital of the Republic of Croatia.

=== Early Zagreb ===
The history of Zagreb dates as far back as 1094 when the Hungarian King Ladislaus, returning from his campaign against the Kingdom of Croatia, founded a diocese. Alongside the bishop's see, the canonical settlement Kaptol developed north of Zagreb Cathedral, as did the fortified settlement Gradec on the neighbouring hill, with the border between the two formed by the Medveščak stream. Today the latter is Zagreb's Upper Town (Gornji grad) and is one of the best-preserved urban nuclei in Croatia. Both settlements came under Mongol attack in 1242. As a sign of gratitude for offering him a safe haven from the Mongols, the Croatian and Hungarian King Béla IV granted Gradec the Golden Bull of 1242, which gave its citizens exemption from county rule and autonomy, as well as their own judicial system.

=== Relationship between Kaptol and Gradec throughout history ===
The development of Kaptol began in 1094 after the foundation of the diocese, while the growth of Gradec began after the Golden Bull was issued in 1242. In the history of the city of Zagreb, there have been numerous conflicts between Gradec and Kaptol, mainly due to disputed issues of rent collection and due to disputed properties.

The first known conflicts took place in the middle of the 13th century and continued with interruptions until 1667. Because of the conflict, it was recorded that the Bishop of Kaptol excommunicated the residents of Gradec twice.

In the conflicts between Gradec and Kaptol, there were several massacres of the citizens, destruction of houses and looting of citizens. In 1850, Gradec and Kaptol, with surrounding settlements, were united into a single settlement, today's city of Zagreb.

=== 16th to 18th centuries ===
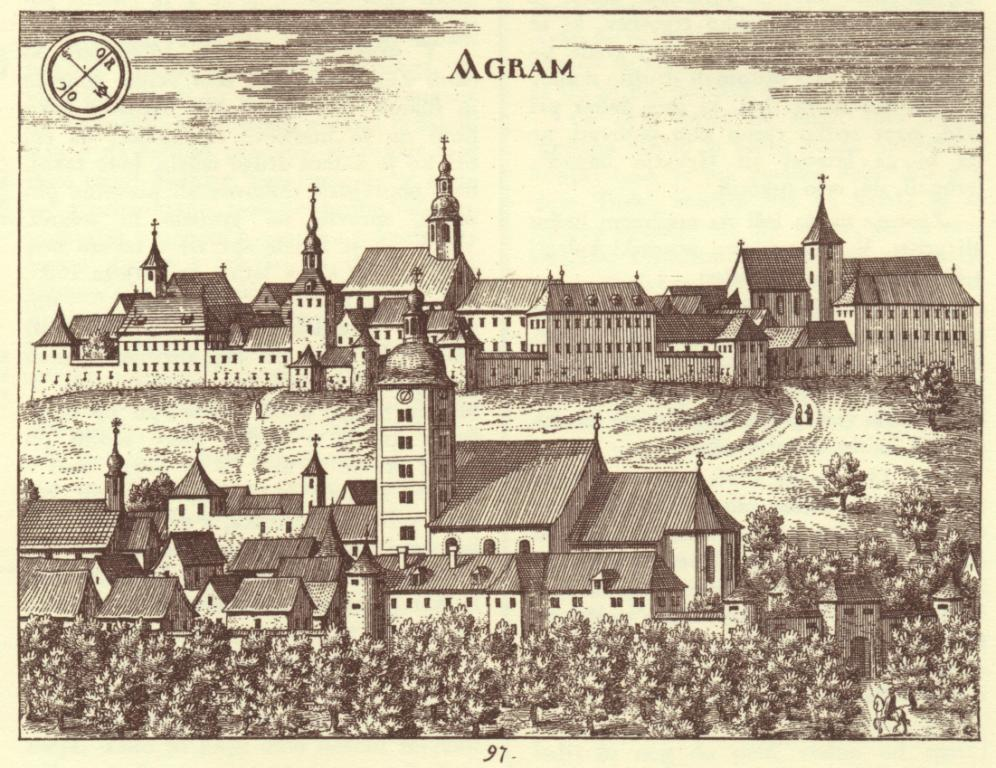
Modern Zagreb's town core emerged from the Upper Town medieval settlements of Gradec and Kaptol. Picture from 1689

There were numerous connections between the Kaptol diocese and the free sovereign town of Gradec for both economic and political reasons, but they were not known as an integrated city, even as Zagreb became the political centre, and the regional Sabor (Latin: Congregatio Regnorum Croatiae, Dalmatiae et Slavoniae) representing Croatia, Slavonia and Dalmatia, first convened at Gradec. Zagreb became the Croatian capital in 1557, with city also being chosen as the seat of the Ban of Croatia in 1621 under ban Nikola IX Frankopan.

At the invitation of the Croatian Parliament, the Jesuits came to Zagreb and built the first grammar school, the St. Catherine's Church (built 1620-1632) and monastery. In 1669, they founded an academy where philosophy, theology, and law were taught, the forerunner of today's University of Zagreb.

During the 17th and 18th centuries, Zagreb was badly devastated by fire and by the plague. In 1776, the royal council (government) moved from Varaždin to Zagreb and during the reign of the Emperor Joseph II Zagreb became the headquarters of the Varaždin and Karlovac general command.

=== 19th to mid-20th century ===
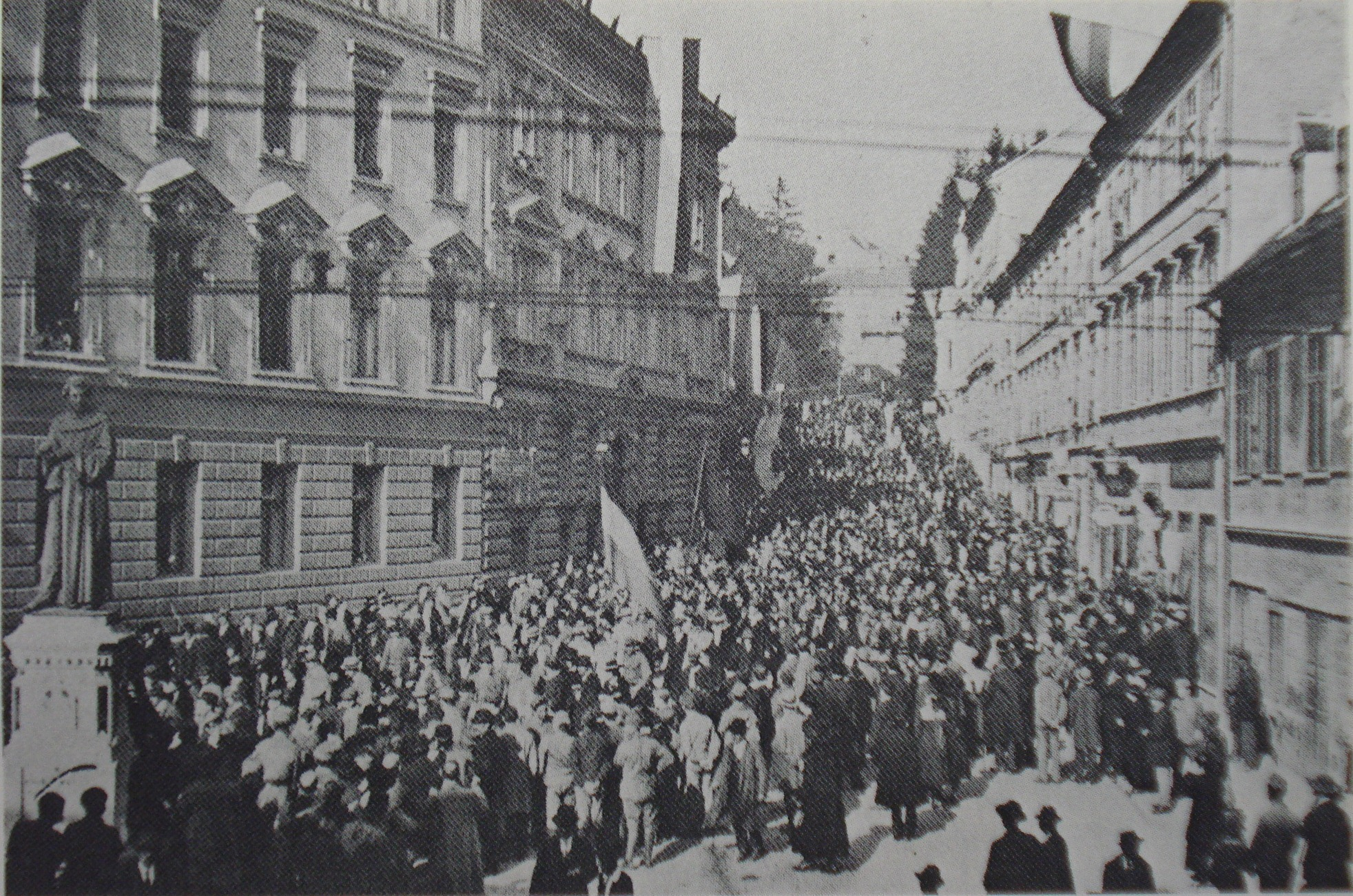
Mass protests in Zagreb against the unification of the State of Slovenes, Croats and Serbs with the Kingdom of Serbia in 1918

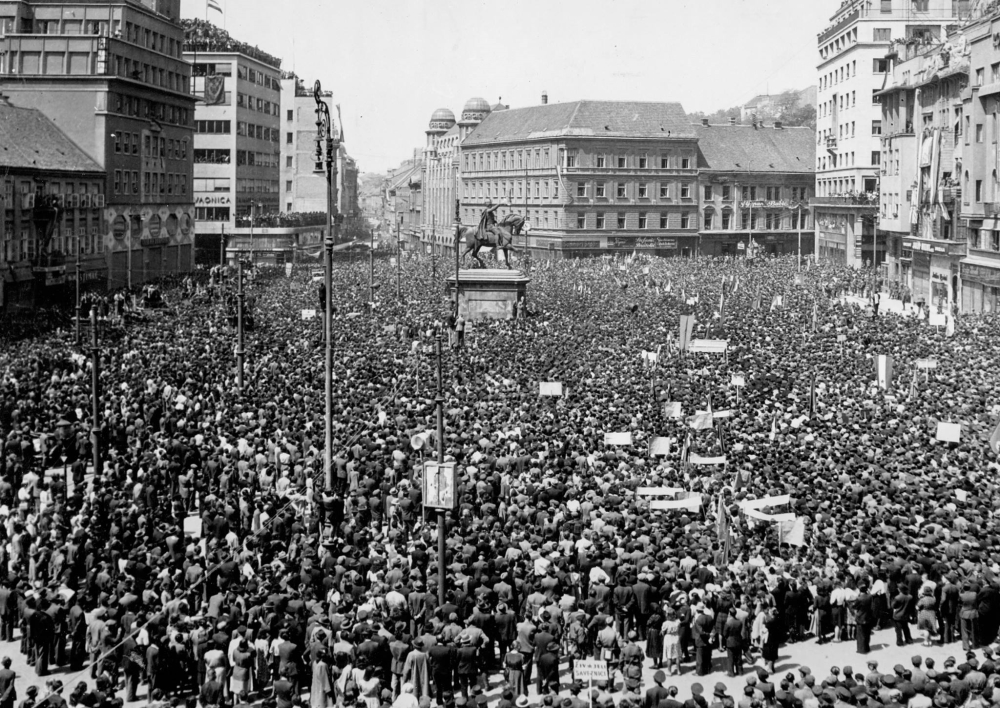
Croatian Partisans enter Ban Jelačić Square on May 9, 1945, national celebration on the square

In the 19th century, Zagreb was the centre of the Croatian National Revival and saw the foundation of important cultural and historic institutions. In 1850, the town was united under its first mayor – Janko Kamauf.

The first railway line to connect Zagreb with Zidani Most and Sisak opened in 1862 and in 1863 Zagreb received a gasworks. Since 1 January 1877, the Grič cannon fires daily from the Lotrščak Tower on Grič to mark midday. The Zagreb waterworks opened in 1878.

After the 1880 Zagreb earthquake, up to the 1914 outbreak of World War I, development flourished and the town received the characteristic layout which it has today. The first horse-drawn tram dated from 1891. The construction of railway lines enabled the old suburbs to merge gradually into Donji Grad, characterized by a regular block pattern that prevails in Central European cities. This bustling core includes many imposing buildings, monuments, and parks as well as a multitude of museums, theatres, and cinemas. An electric-power plant was built in 1907.

The first half of the 20th century saw a considerable expansion of Zagreb. Before World War I, the city expanded and neighborhoods like Stara Peščenica in the east and Črnomerec in the west grew up. The Rokov perivoj neighbourhood, noted for its Art Nouveau features, was established at the start of the century.

After the war, working-class districts such as Trnje emerged between the railway and the Sava, whereas the construction of residential districts on the hills of the southern slopes of Medvednica was completed between the two World Wars.

In the 1920s, the population of Zagreb increased by 70 percent – the largest demographic boom in the history of the town. In 1926, the first radio station in the region began broadcasting from Zagreb, and in 1947 the Zagreb Fair opened.

During World War II, Zagreb became the capital of the Independent State of Croatia (1941–1945), which was backed by Nazi Germany and by the Italians. The history of Zagreb in World War II became rife with incidents of régime terror and resistance sabotage - the Ustaša régime had thousands of people executed during the war in and near the city. Partisans took the city at the end of the war. From 1945 until 1990, Zagreb functioned as the capital of the Socialist Republic of Croatia, one of the six constituent socialist republics of the Socialist Federal Republic of Yugoslavia.

=== Contemporary era ===
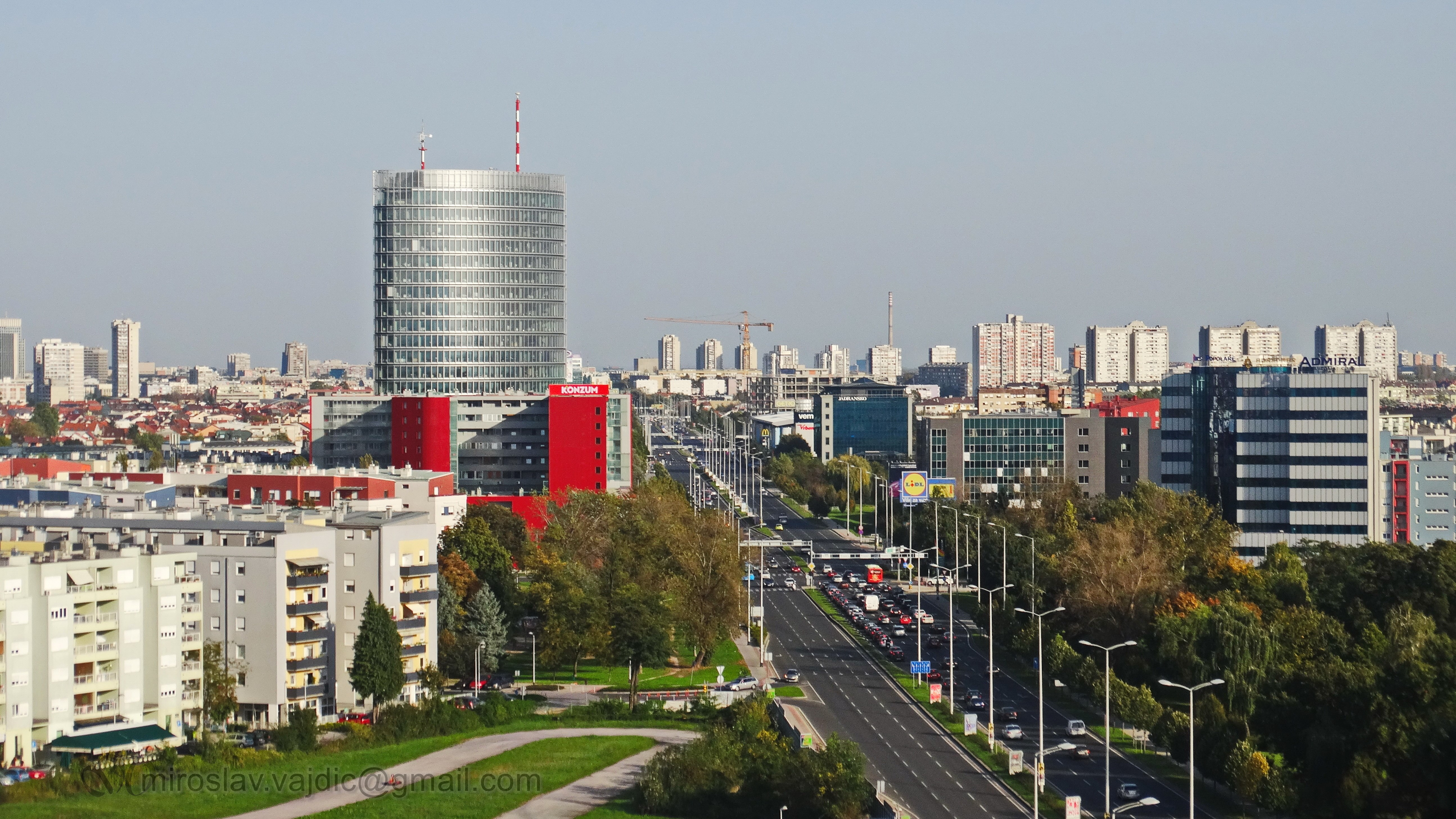
Urbanization of Zagreb

The area between the railway and the Sava river witnessed a new construction-boom after World War II. After the mid-1950s, construction of new residential areas south of the Sava river began, resulting in Novi Zagreb (Croatian for New Zagreb), originally called "Južni Zagreb" (Southern Zagreb). From 1999 Novi Zagreb has comprised two city districts: Novi Zagreb – zapad (New Zagreb – West) and Novi Zagreb – istok (New Zagreb – East)

The city also expanded westward and eastward, incorporating Dubrava, Podsused, Jarun, Blato, and other settlements.

The cargo railway hub and the international airport (Pleso) were built south of the Sava river. The largest industrial zone (Žitnjak) in the south-eastern part of the city, represents an extension of the industrial zones on the eastern outskirts of the city, between the Sava and the Prigorje region. Zagreb hosted the Summer Universiade in 1987. This event initiated the creation of pedestrian-only zones in the city centre and extensive new sport infrastructure, lacking until then, all around the city.

During the 1991–1995 Croatian War of Independence, the city saw some sporadic fighting around its JNA army barracks, but escaped major damage. In May 1995, it was targeted by Serb rocket artillery in two rocket attacks which killed seven civilians and wounded many.

An urbanized area connects Zagreb with the surrounding towns of Zaprešić, Samobor, Dugo Selo, and Velika Gorica. Sesvete was the first and the closest area to become a part of the agglomeration and is already included in the City of Zagreb for administrative purposes and now forms the easternmost city district.

== Geography ==
=== Climate ===
The climate of Zagreb is classified as a humid temperate climate. It is further classified as oceanic climate (Köppen: Cfb) bordering on a humid subtropical climate (Köppen: Cfa).

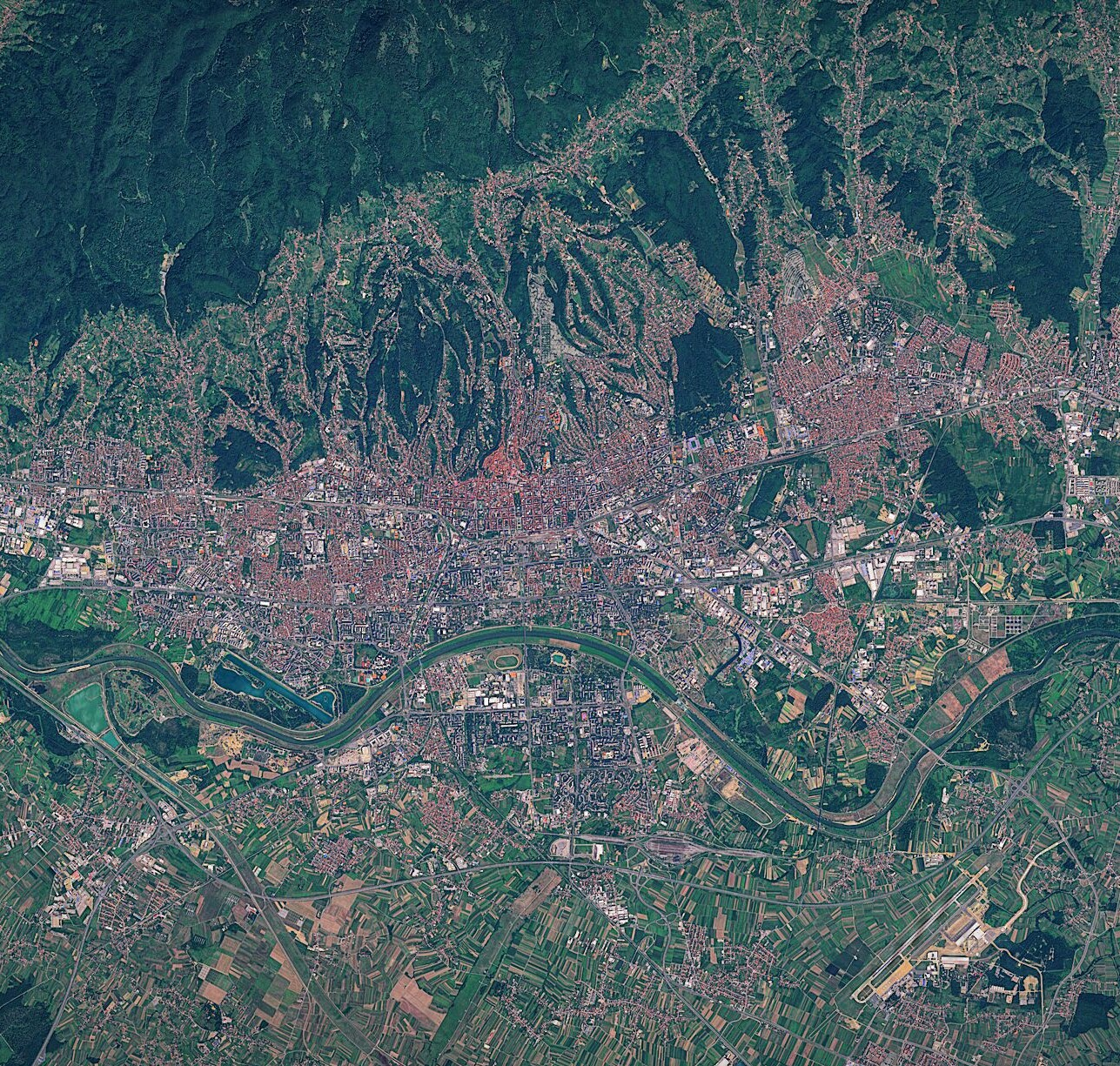
Satellite view of Zagreb

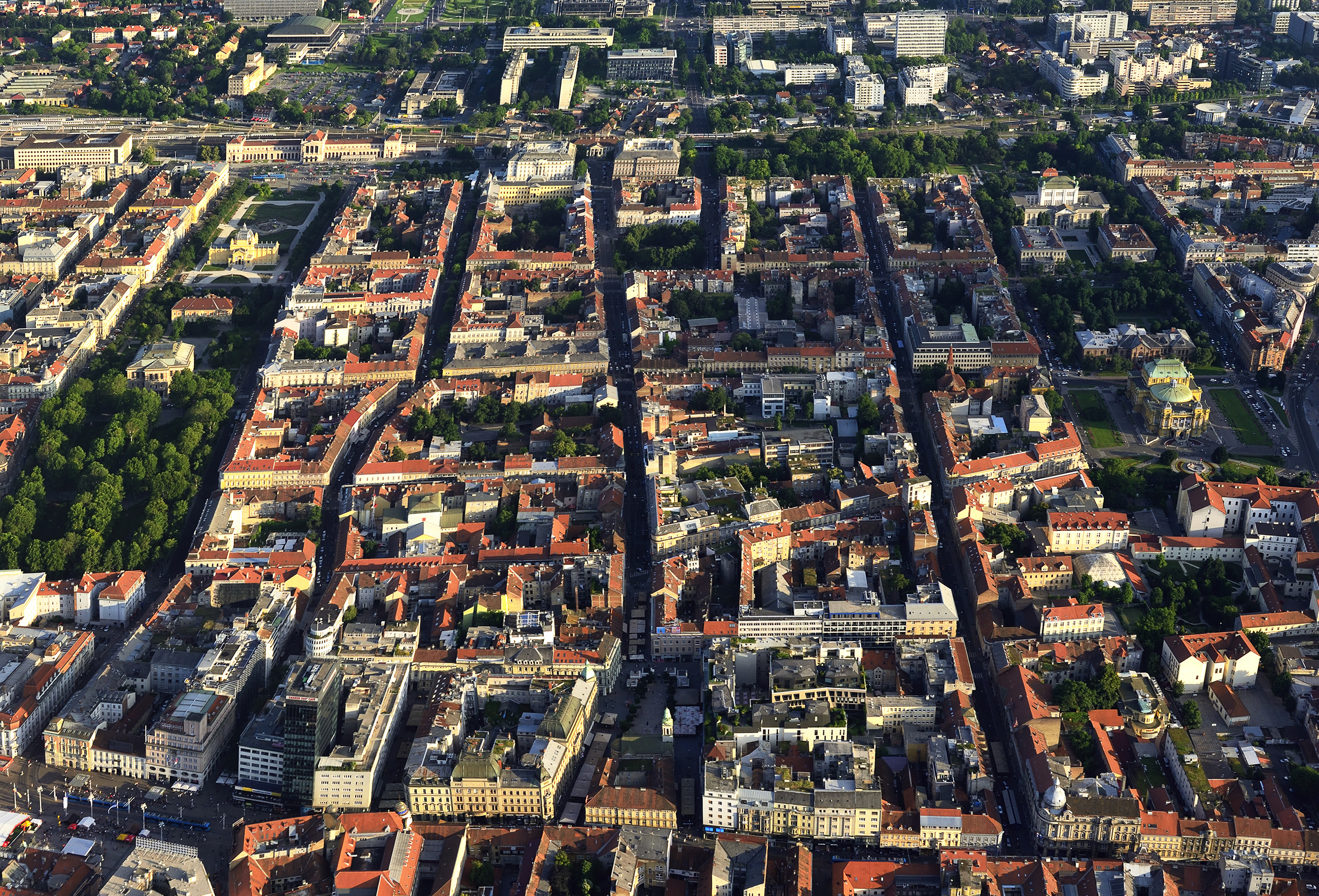
Aerial view of Zagreb's downtown

Zagreb has four distinct seasons. Summers are generally warm, sometimes hot. In late May it gets significantly warmer, temperatures start rising and it often becomes very warm or even hot with occasional afternoon and evening thunderstorms. Heatwaves can occur but are short-lived. Temperatures rise above 30 °C (86 °F) on average on 14.6 days in summer. During summertime, rainfall is abundant, often due to thunderstorms. With 840 mm of precipitation per year, Zagreb is Europe's ninth wettest capital, receiving less precipitation than Luxembourg but more than Brussels, Paris or London. Compared to these cities, however, Zagreb has fewer rainy days, but the annual rainfall is higher due to heavier showers occurring mainly in late spring and summer. Autumn in its early stage often brings pleasant and sunny weather with occasional episodes of rain later in the season. Late autumn is characterized by a mild increase in the number of rainy days and a gradual decrease in daily temperature averages. Morning fog is common from mid-October to January, with northern city districts at the foothills of the Medvednica mountain, as well as south-central districts along the Sava river, being more prone to longer fog accumulation. Winters are relatively cold, bringing overcast skies and a precipitation decrease pattern. February is the driest month, averaging 39 mm of precipitation. On average there are 29 days with snowfall, with the first snow usually falling in early December. However, in recent years, the number of days with snowfall in wintertime has decreased considerably. Spring is characterized by often pleasant but changeable weather. As the season progresses, sunny days become more frequent, bringing higher temperatures. Sometimes cold spells can occur as well, mostly in the season's early stages. The average daily mean temperature in the winter is around 1 °C (34 °F) (from December to February) and the average temperature in the summer is 20 °C (68.0 °F). The highest recorded temperature at the Maksimir weather station was 40.4 °C (104.7 °F) in July 1950, and lowest was −27.3 °C (−17.1 °F) in February 1956. A temperature of −30.5 °C (−22.9 °F) was recorded on the since defunct Borongaj Airfield in February 1940.

Since records began in 1981, the highest temperature recorded at the Rim weather station in Zagreb was 38.4 °C (101.1 °F), on 8 August 2018. The coldest temperature was −19.4 °C (−2.9 °F), on 12 January 1985.

Climate data for Zagreb Maksimir (1991–2020, extremes 1861–present)
Month	Jan	Feb	Mar	Apr	May	Jun	Jul	Aug	Sep	Oct	Nov	Dec	Year
Record high °C (°F)	19.4 (66.9)	22.6 (72.7)	26.0 (78.8)	30.5 (86.9)	33.7 (92.7)	38.2 (100.8)	40.4 (104.7)	39.8 (103.6)	34.0 (93.2)	29.2 (84.6)	25.4 (77.7)	22.5 (72.5)	40.4 (104.7)
Mean daily maximum °C (°F)	5.0 (41.0)	7.8 (46.0)	13.0 (55.4)	18.0 (64.4)	22.4 (72.3)	26.2 (79.2)	28.1 (82.6)	28.1 (82.6)	22.6 (72.7)	17.0 (62.6)	10.7 (51.3)	5.3 (41.5)	17.0 (62.6)
Daily mean °C (°F)	1.4 (34.5)	3.0 (37.4)	7.4 (45.3)	12.2 (54.0)	16.7 (62.1)	20.6 (69.1)	22.2 (72.0)	21.8 (71.2)	16.7 (62.1)	11.7 (53.1)	6.8 (44.2)	1.9 (35.4)	11.9 (53.4)
Mean daily minimum °C (°F)	−2.0 (28.4)	−1.2 (29.8)	2.5 (36.5)	6.6 (43.9)	11.0 (51.8)	14.7 (58.5)	16.2 (61.2)	16.0 (60.8)	11.8 (53.2)	7.5 (45.5)	3.4 (38.1)	−1.1 (30.0)	7.1 (44.8)
Record low °C (°F)	−24.3 (−11.7)	−27.3 (−17.1)	−18.3 (−0.9)	−4.4 (24.1)	−1.8 (28.8)	2.5 (36.5)	5.4 (41.7)	3.7 (38.7)	−0.6 (30.9)	−5.6 (21.9)	−13.5 (7.7)	−19.8 (−3.6)	−27.3 (−17.1)
Average precipitation mm (inches)	45.7 (1.80)	45.0 (1.77)	48.0 (1.89)	60.6 (2.39)	76.5 (3.01)	90.8 (3.57)	80.4 (3.17)	85.6 (3.37)	103.8 (4.09)	88.5 (3.48)	87.4 (3.44)	61.8 (2.43)	874.0 (34.41)
Average precipitation days (≥ 0.1 mm)	10.2	10.0	10.3	12.6	13.4	12.6	11.4	9.3	11.9	10.9	12.0	11.8	136.5
Average snowy days (≥ 1.0 cm)	8.5	6.7	1.8	0.1	0.0	0.0	0.0	0.0	0.0	0.0	1.3	6.7	25.1
Average relative humidity (%)	81	74	68	65	66	67	66	68	75	80	83	84	73
Mean monthly sunshine hours	69.1	98.9	149.9	190.4	246.1	266.0	293.6	274.3	183.7	131.3	66.4	52.7	2,026
Mean daily daylight hours	9.2	10.4	11.9	13.6	15	15.7	15.3	14.1	12.5	10.9	9.5	8.7	12.2
Percentage possible sunshine	23	39	43	45	54	55	63	63	54	41	26	23	47
Average ultraviolet index	1	2	3	5	7	8	8	7	5	3	1	1	4
Source 1: Croatian Meteorological and Hydrological Service
Source 2: Weather Atlas

=== Cityscape ===
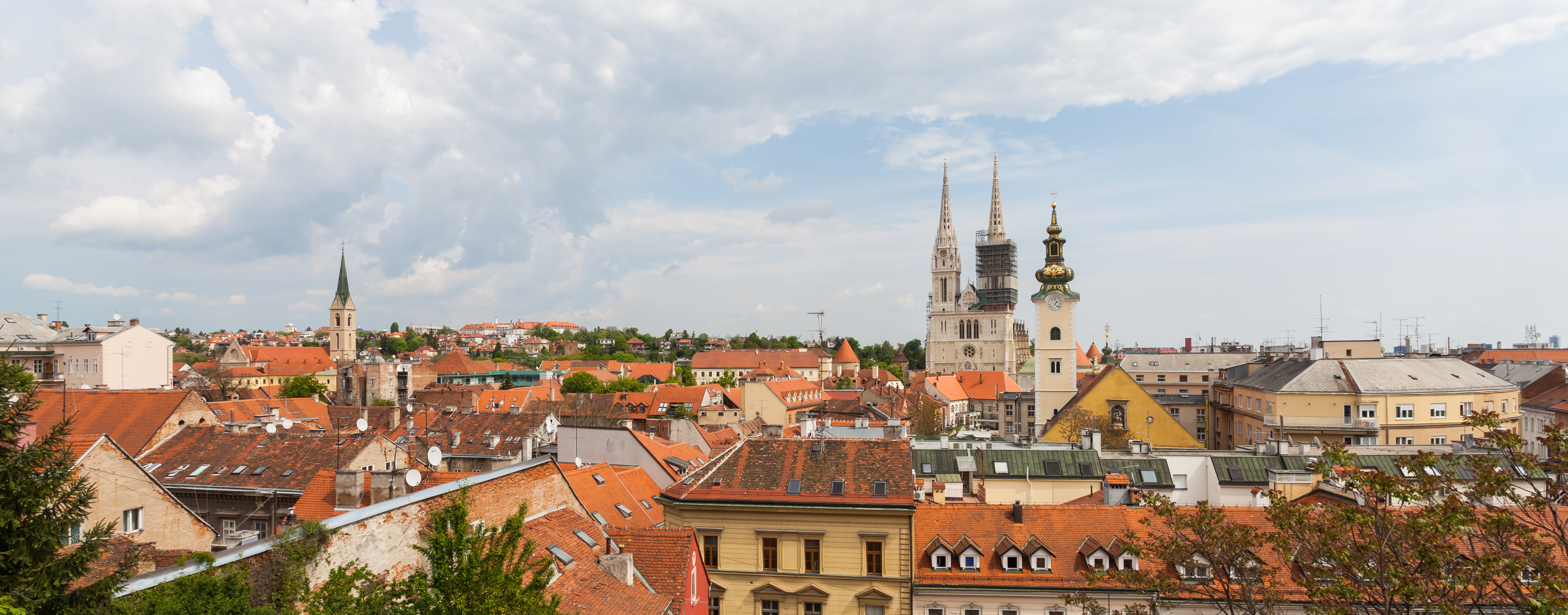
Panoramic view from Zagreb's upper town, with (from left to right) St. Francis of Assisi Church, Šalata, Zagreb Cathedral and St. Mary's Church

The most important historical high-rise constructions are Neboder (1958) on Ban Jelačić Square, Cibona Tower (1987), and Zagrepčanka (1976) on Savska Street, Mamutica in Travno (Novi Zagreb – istok district, built in 1974) and Zagreb TV Tower on Sljeme (built in 1973).

In the 2000s, the City Assembly approved a new plan that allowed for the many recent high-rise buildings in Zagreb, such as the Almeria Tower, Eurotower, HOTO Tower, Zagrebtower, Sky Office Tower and the tallest high-rise building in Zagreb Strojarska Business Center.

In Novi Zagreb, the neighbourhoods of Blato and Lanište expanded significantly, including the Zagreb Arena and the adjoining business centre.

Due to a long-standing restriction that forbade the construction of 10-story or higher buildings, most of Zagreb's high-rise buildings date from the 1970s and 1980s and new apartment buildings on the outskirts of the city are usually 4–8 floors tall. Exceptions to the restriction have been made in recent years, such as permitting the construction of high-rise buildings in Lanište or Kajzerica.

=== Surroundings ===
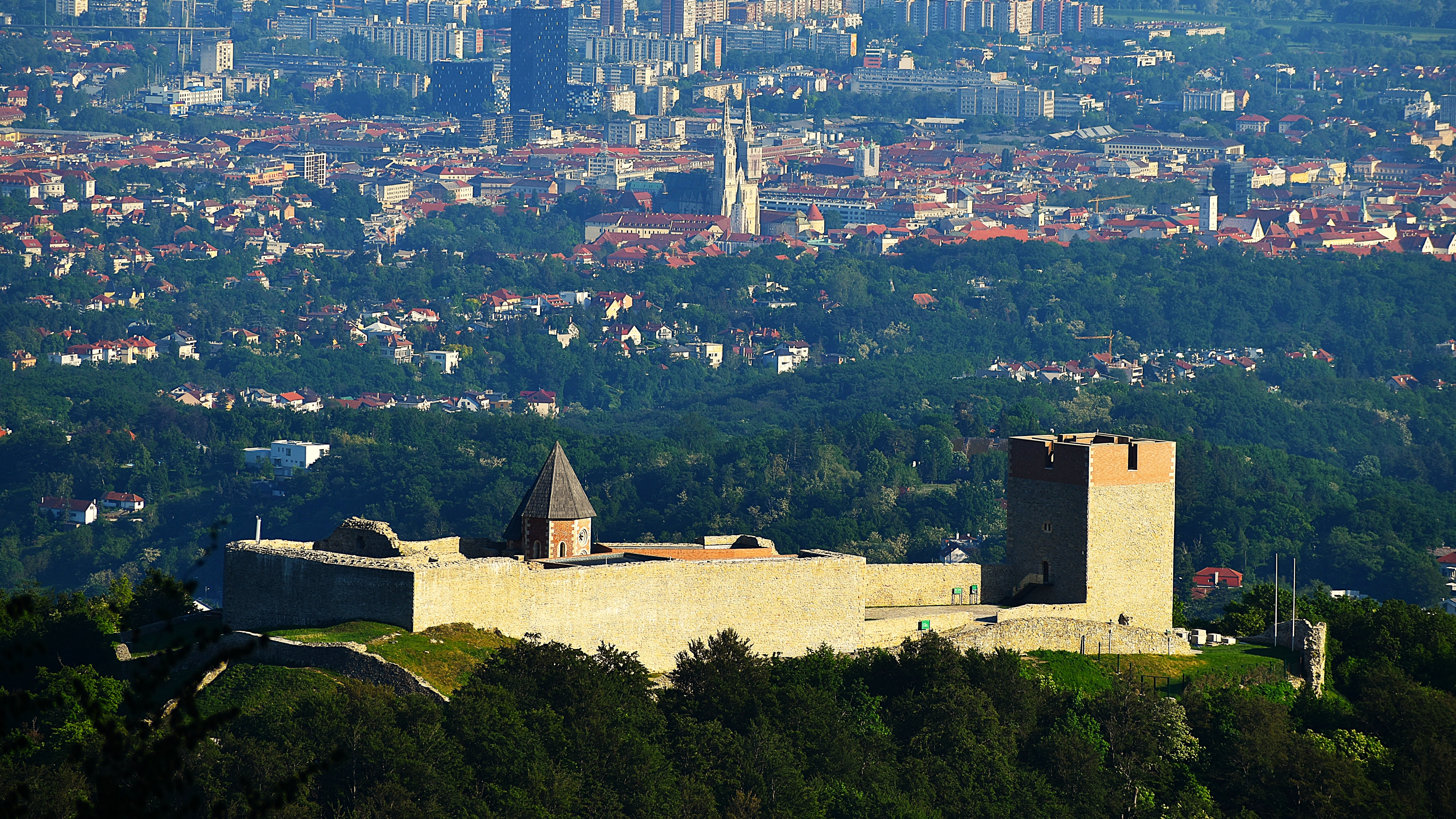
Medvedgrad fortress

The wider Zagreb area has been continuously inhabited since the prehistoric period, as witnessed by archaeological findings in the Veternica cave from the Paleolithic and excavation of the remains of the Roman Andautonia near the present village of Šćitarjevo.

Former villages on the slopes of Medvednica, Šestine, Gračani, and Remete, maintain their traditions, including folk costumes, Šestine umbrellas, and gingerbread products.

To the north is the Medvednica mountain (Croatian: Zagrebačka gora), with its highest peak Sljeme (1,035 m), where one of the tallest structures in Croatia, Zagreb TV Tower is located. The Sava and the Kupa valleys are to the south of Zagreb, and the region of Hrvatsko Zagorje is located on the other (northern) side of the Medvednica hill. In mid-January 2005, Sljeme held its first World Ski Championship tournament.

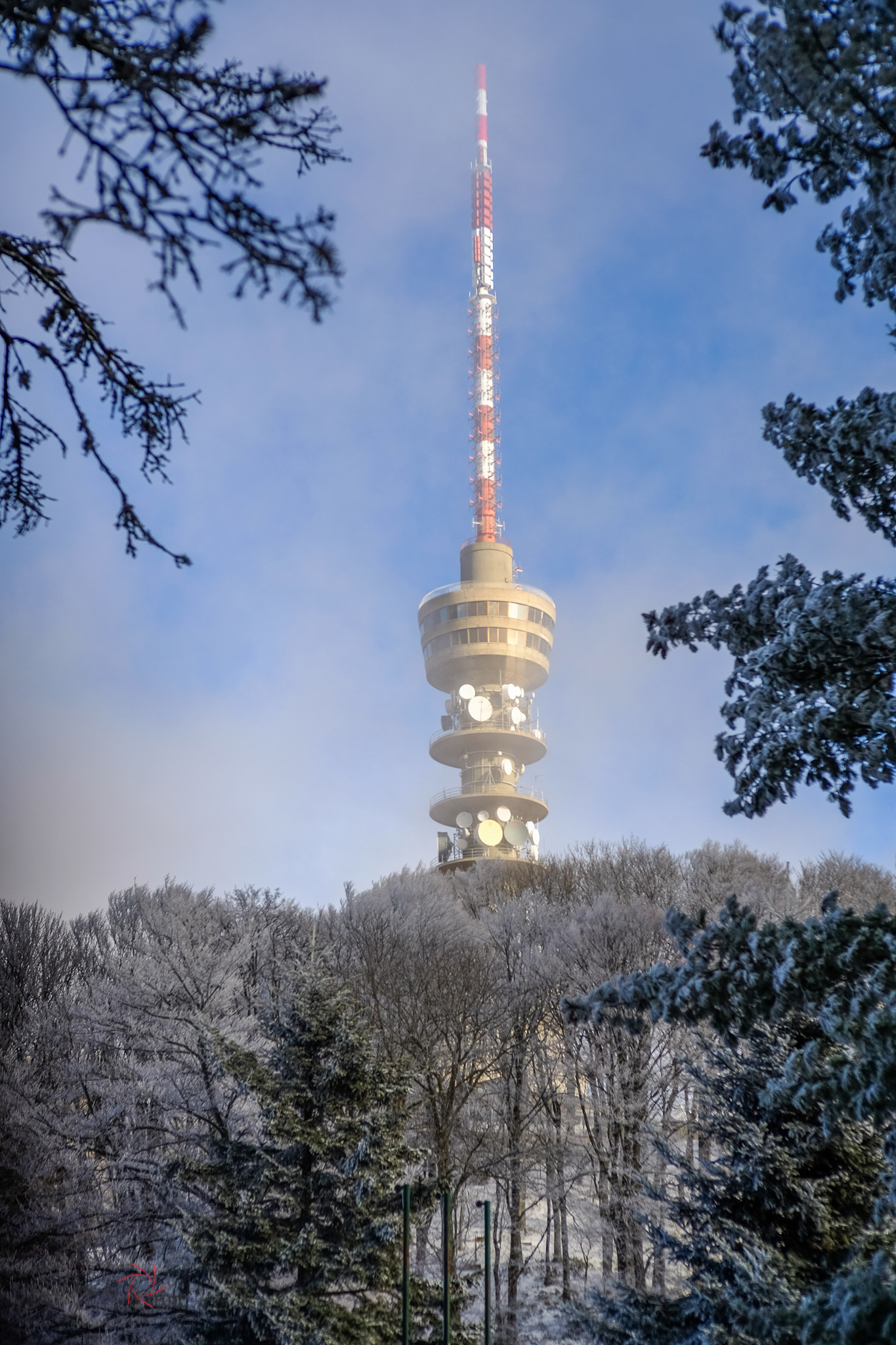
Zagreb TV Tower

From the summit, weather permitting, the vista reaches as far as Velebit Range along Croatia's rocky northern coast, as well as the snow-capped peaks of the towering Julian Alps in neighbouring Slovenia. There are several lodging villages, offering accommodation and restaurants for hikers. Skiers visit Sljeme, which has four ski-runs, three ski-lifts, and a chairlift.

The old Medvedgrad, a recently restored medieval burg was built in the 13th century on Medvednica hill. It overlooks the western part of the city and also hosts the Shrine of the Homeland, a memorial with an eternal flame, where Croatia pays reverence to all its heroes fallen for homeland in its history, customarily on national holidays. The ruined medieval fortress Susedgrad is located on the far-western side of Medvednica hill. It has been abandoned since the early 17th century, but it is visited during the year.

Zagreb occasionally experiences earthquakes, due to the proximity of Žumberak-Medvednica fault zone. It is classified as an area of high seismic activity. The area around Medvednica was the epicentre of the 1880 Zagreb earthquake (magnitude 6.3), and the area is known for occasional landslide threatening houses in the area. The proximity of strong seismic sources presents a real danger of strong earthquakes. Croatian Chief of Office of Emergency Management Pavle Kalinić stated Zagreb experiences around 400 earthquakes a year, most of them being imperceptible. However, in case of a strong earthquake, it is expected that 3,000 people would die and up to 15,000 would be wounded. In 2020 the city experienced a 5.5 magnitude earthquake, which damaged various buildings in the historic downtown area. The city's iconic cathedral lost the cross of one of its towers. This earthquake was the strongest one to affect the city since the destructive 1880 Zagreb earthquake.

== Demographics ==
Zagreb population pyramid

Zagreb is by far the largest city in Croatia in terms of population, which was 767,131 in 2021.

Historical population
Year	Pop.	±%
1857	48,266	—
1869	54,761	+13.5%
1880	67,188	+22.7%
1890	82,848	+23.3%
1900	111,565	+34.7%
1910	136,351	+22.2%
1921	167,765	+23.0%
1931	258,024	+53.8%
1948	356,529	+38.2%
1953	393,919	+10.5%
1961	478,076	+21.4%
1971	629,896	+31.8%
1981	723,065	+14.8%
1991	777,826	+7.6%
2001	779,145	+0.2%
2011	790,017	+1.4%
2021	767,131	−2.9%
Source: Croatian Bureau of Statistics publications

Zagreb metropolitan area population is slightly above one million inhabitants, as it includes the Zagreb County. Zagreb metropolitan area makes approximately a quarter of the total population of Croatia. In 1997, the City of Zagreb was given its own special County status, separating it from Zagreb County, although it remains the administrative centre of both.

The majority of its citizens are Croats, making up 93.53% of the population. The other 6.47% of the population are residents belonging to ethnic minorities: 12,035 Serbs (1.57%), 6,566 Bosniaks (0.86%), 3,475 Albanians (0.45%), 2,167 Romani (0.28%), 1,312 Slovenes (0.17%), 1,036 Macedonians (0.15%), 865 Montenegrins (0.11%), and a number of other smaller communities.

After the easing of COVID-19 pandemic restrictions, thousands of foreign workers immigrated to Zagreb due to a shortage of labour in Croatia. These workers primarily come from countries such as Nepal, the Philippines, India, and Bangladesh, as well as some European countries including Bosnia and Herzegovina, Serbia, Kosovo and North Macedonia. However, the majority of these workers are on temporary work permits, and might not plan on staying in the country permanently, mostly due to language skills and citizenship requirements.

City of Zagreb: Population trends 1857–2021
v

population	48266	54761	67188	82848	111565	136351	167765	258024	356529	393919	478076	629896	723065	777826	779145	790017	767131
	1857	1869	1880	1890	1900	1910	1921	1931	1948	1953	1961	1971	1981	1991	2001	2011	2021

Sources: Croatian Bureau of Statistics publications

=== City districts ===
Districts of Zagreb

Since 1999, the City of Zagreb is divided into 17 city districts:

	District	Area (km^{2})	Population (2001)	Population (2021)	Population density
1.	Donji Grad	3.02	45,108	31,209	10,334
2.	Gornji Grad–Medveščak	10.18	36,384	26,423	2,596
3.	Trnje	7.36	45,267	40,539	5,508
4.	Maksimir	14.97	49,750	47,356	3,163
5.	Peščenica – Žitnjak	35.29	58,283	53,023	1,502
6.	Novi Zagreb – istok	16.54	65,301	55,898	3,380
7.	Novi Zagreb – zapad	62.63	48,981	63,917	1,021
8.	Trešnjevka – sjever	5.81	55,358	52,974	9,118
9.	Trešnjevka – jug	9.84	67,162	65,324	6,639
10.	Črnomerec	24.16	38,762	38,084	1,576
11.	Gornja Dubrava	40.43	61,388	58,255	1,441
12.	Donja Dubrava	10.79	35,944	33,537	3,108
13.	Stenjevec	12.24	41,257	53,862	4,400
14.	Podsused – Vrapče	36.19	42,360	44,910	1,241
15.	Podsljeme	69.25	17,744	18,974	320
16.	Sesvete	165.22	59,212	70,800	429
17.	Brezovica	127.32	10,884	12,046	95
	Total	641.24	779,145	767,131	1,196

=== Settlements ===
Year	Area (km^{2})	Population (within city limits at that time)	Population (within today's city limits)
1368		2,810 (Note: From the household census)	
1742	3.33	5,600	
1805	3.33	7,706 (Note: Population census without clergy and nobility) (≈11 000 in total)	
1817	10.0	9,055	
1837	25.4	15,155	
1842	25.4	15,952	
1848	25.4	15,978	
1850	25.4	16,036	
1857	25.4	16,657	48,266
1869	25.4	19,857	54,761
1880	25.4	30,830	67,188
1890	25.4	40,268	82,848
1900	64.37	61,002	111,565
1910	64.37	79,038	136,351
1921	64.37	108,674	167,765
1931	64.37	185,581	258,024
1948	74.99	279,623	356,529
1953	235.74	350,829	393,919
1961	495.60	430,802	478,076
1971	497.95	602,205	629,896
1981	1,261.54	768,700	723,065
1991	1,715.55	933,914	777,826
2001	641.36	779,145	779,145
2011	641.36	790,017	790,017
2019	641.36	806,341	806,341
The data in column 3 refers to the population in the city borders as of the census in question. Column 4 is calculated for the territory now defined as the City of Zagreb (Narodne Novine 97/10).

The city itself is not the only standalone settlement in the City of Zagreb administrative area – there are a number of larger urban settlements such as Sesvete and Lučko and a number of smaller villages attached to it whose population is tracked separately.

There are 70 settlements in the City of Zagreb administrative area:

- Adamovec, population 975
- Belovar, population 378
- Blaguša, population 594
- Botinec, population 9
- Brebernica, population 49
- Brezovica, population 594
- Budenec, population 323
- Buzin, population 1,055
- Cerje, population 398
- Demerje, population 721
- Desprim, population 377
- Dobrodol, population 1,203
- Donji Čehi, population 232
- Donji Dragonožec, population 577
- Donji Trpuci, population 428
- Drenčec, population 131
- Drežnik Brezovički, population 656
- Dumovec, population 903
- Đurđekovec, population 778
- Gajec, population 311
- Glavnica Donja, population 544
- Glavnica Gornja, population 226
- Glavničica, population 229
- Goli Breg, population 406
- Goranec, population 449
- Gornji Čehi, population 363
- Gornji Dragonožec, population 295
- Gornji Trpuci, population 87
- Grančari, population 221
- Havidić Selo, population 53
- Horvati, population 1,490
- Hrašće Turopoljsko, population 1,202
- Hrvatski Leskovac, population 2,687
- Hudi Bitek, population 441
- Ivanja Reka, population 1,800
- Jesenovec, population 460
- Ježdovec, population 1,728
- Kašina, population 1,548
- Kašinska Sopnica, population 245
- Kučilovina, population 219
- Kućanec, population 228
- Kupinečki Kraljevec, population 1,957
- Lipnica, population 207
- Lučko, population 3,010
- Lužan, population 719
- Mala Mlaka, population 636
- Markovo Polje, population 425
- Moravče, population 663
- Odra, population 1,866
- Odranski Obrež, population 1,578
- Paruževina, population 632
- Planina Donja, population 554
- Planina Gornja, population 247
- Popovec, population 937
- Prekvršje, population 809
- Prepuštovec, population 332
- Sesvete, population 54,085
- Soblinec, population 978
- Starjak, population 227
- Strmec, population 645
- Šašinovec, population 678
- Šimunčevec, population 271
- Veliko Polje, population 1,668
- Vuger Selo, population 273
- Vugrovec Donji, population 442
- Vugrovec Gornji, population 357
- Vurnovec, population 201
- Zadvorsko, population 1,288
- Zagreb, population 688,163
- Žerjavinec, population 556

== Politics and government ==
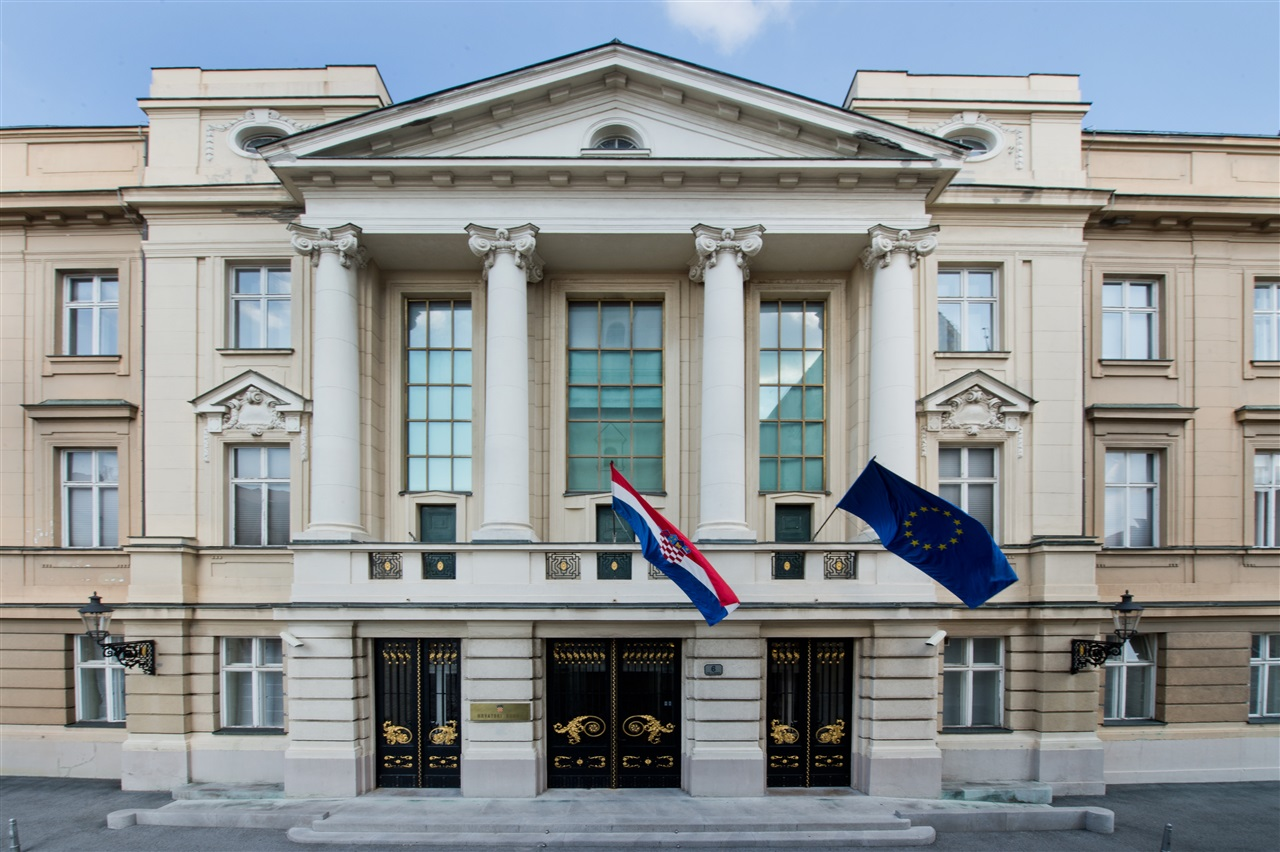
Croatian Parliament on St. Mark's Square

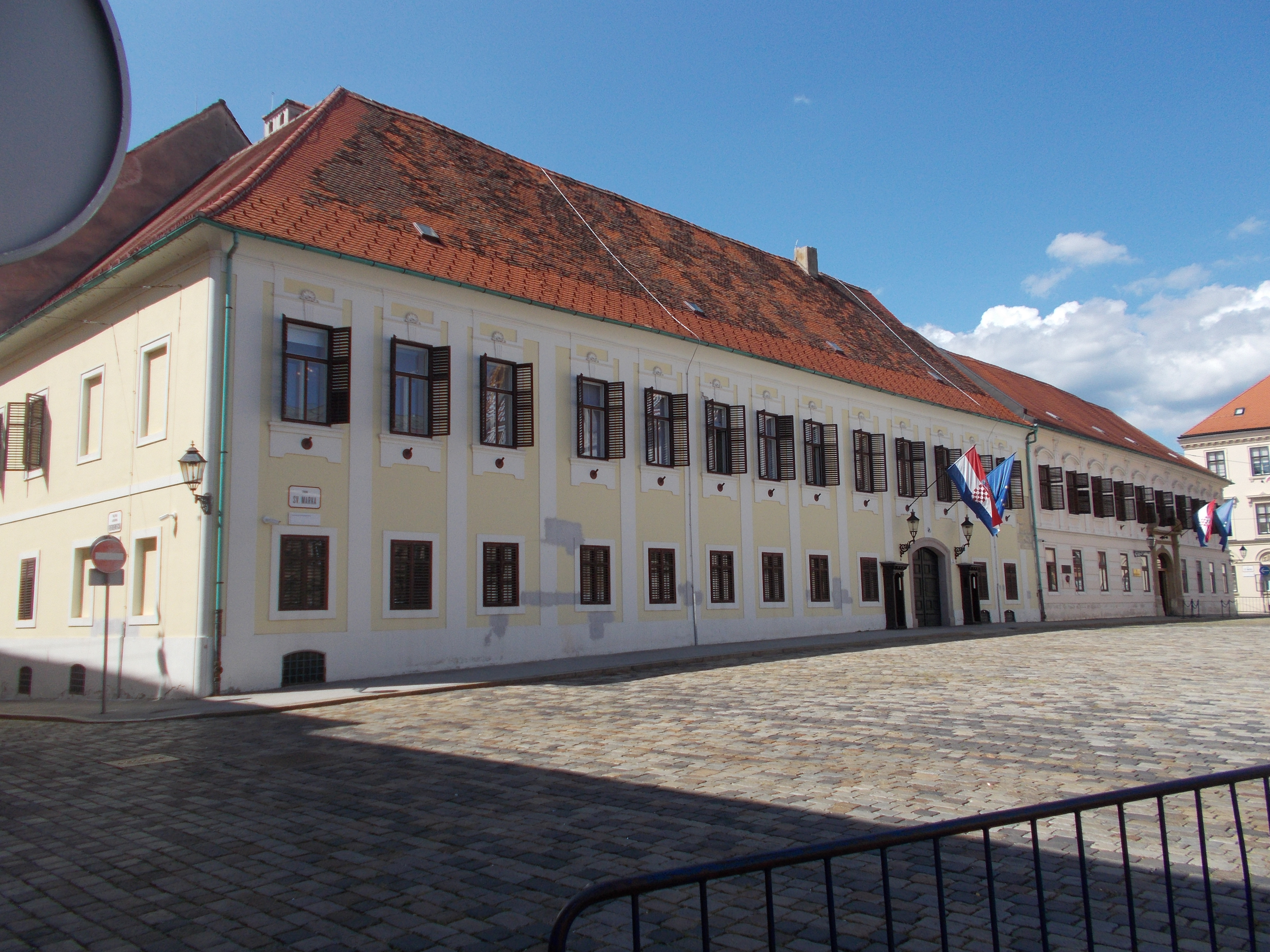
Banski dvori, seat of the Government of Croatia

Zagreb is the capital of the Republic of Croatia, its political centre and the centre of various state institutions.

On the St. Mark's Square are the seats of the Government of the Republic of Croatia in the Banski Dvori complex, the Croatian Parliament (Sabor), as well as the Constitutional Court of the Republic of Croatia. Various ministries and state agencies are located in the wider area of the City of Zagreb.

=== City governance ===
According to the constitution, the city of Zagreb, as the capital of Croatia, has a special status. As such, Zagreb performs self-governing public affairs of both city and county. It is also the seat of the Zagreb County which encircles Zagreb. The city administration bodies are the Zagreb City Assembly as the representative body and the Mayor of Zagreb who is the executive head of the city. The current mayor is Tomislav Tomašević (We Can!), elected in the 2021 Zagreb local elections, the second round of which was held on 30 May 2021. There are two deputy mayors elected from the same list, Danijela Dolenec and Luka Korlaet.

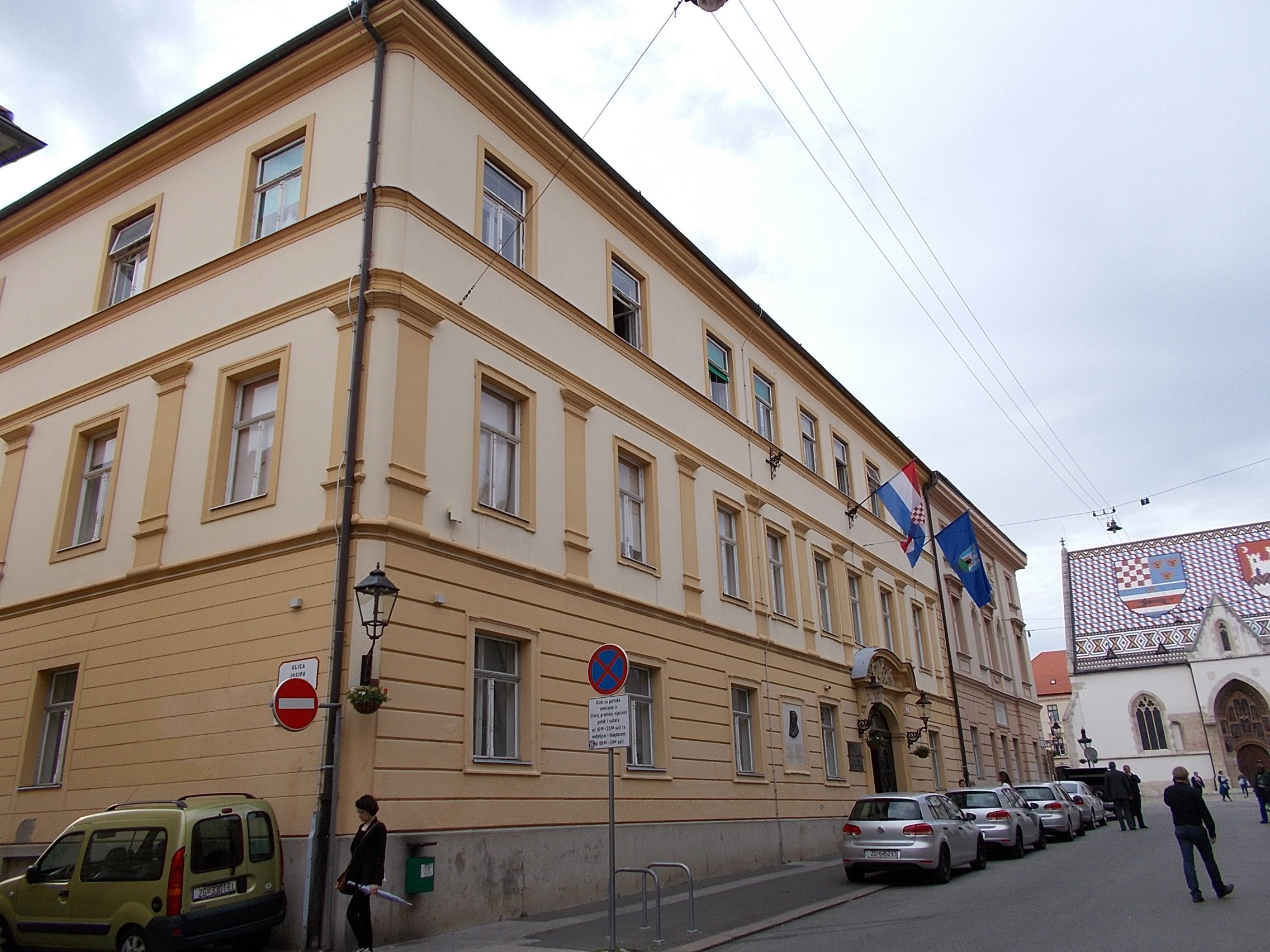
Zagreb Assembly

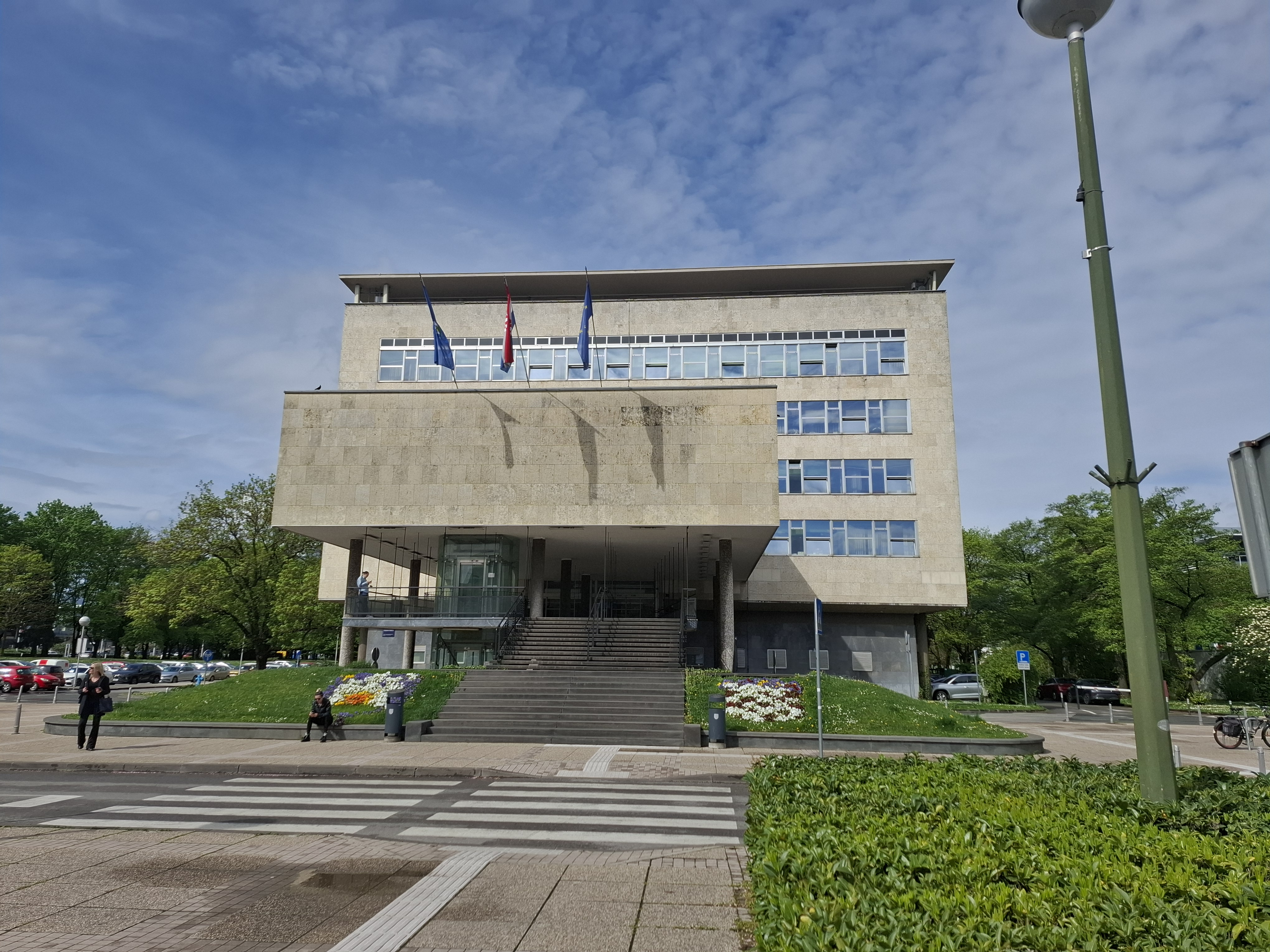
City hall

The 47 representatives of the City Assembly is elected for a four-year term on the basis of universal suffrage in direct elections by secret ballot using proportional system with d'Hondt method in a manner specified by law. The president and vice-presidents of the assembly are elected by the representatives. All changes to urban planning documents and the budget must be passed through the assembly.

The Office of the Mayor and the deputies are elected on a four-year term. Before 2009, the mayor was elected by the City Assembly, but was changed to direct elections by majoritarian vote with a two-round system. The mayor, along with the deputies, may be recalled by a referendum according to the law from not less than 20% of all electors or two-thirds of the assembly. The mayor is responsible for the state administration due to the city's special status, including appointing all heads of city offices and services. The city administration is divided into 12 city offices which are responsible for managing everything from urban planning to culture, the City institute for the Protection of Cultural and Natural Monuments, System Information and Technical Affairs Service, City Administration Expert Service and the City Assembly Expert Service, which is managed by a secretary appointed by the assembly. The city owns Zagreb Holding, a city enterprise which operates many branches carrying out all operating tasks, and Zagreb Electric Tram, the city transit authority.

Local government is organized into 17 city districts represented by City District Councils which are elected by the district's residents. Districts have to adopt plans for the maintenance of infrastructure and for community programs and projects, and can propose changes to urban development documents. The city is further subdivided into 218 local committees, the second level of local self-government. They are in charge of organizing cultural or other events in the area and listening to the problems of citizens living there. Since 2024, as part of participatory budgeting, residents can propose and discuss new projects in their neighborhoods.

==== Minority councils and representatives ====
Directly elected minority councils and representatives are tasked with consulting tasks for the local or regional authorities in which they are advocating for minority rights and interests, integration into public life and participation in the management of local affairs. At the 2023 Croatian national minorities councils and representatives elections Albanians, Bosniaks, Czechs, Hungarians, Macedonians, Montenegrins, Roma, Slovenes and Serbs of Croatia each fulfilled legal requirements to elect 25 members minority councils of the City of Zagreb while Bulgarians, Poles, Pannonian Rusyns, Russians, Slovaks, Italians, Turks, Ukrainians and Jews of Croatia elected individual representatives, with a representative of the Germans of Croatia remaining unelected due to the lack of candidates.

=== International relations ===
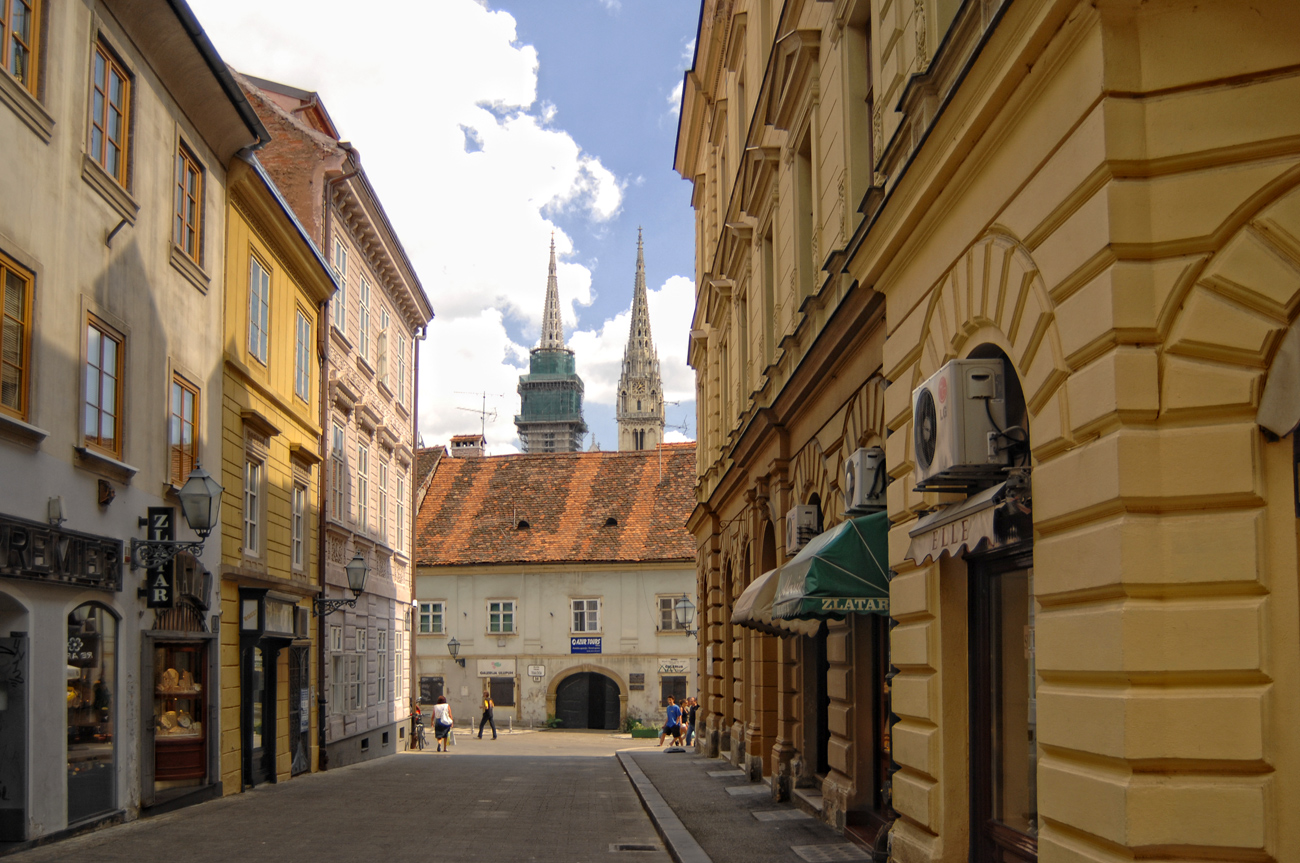
Krvavi Most ("Bloody Bridge") street, known for historical fights between Gradec and Kaptol in 17th century

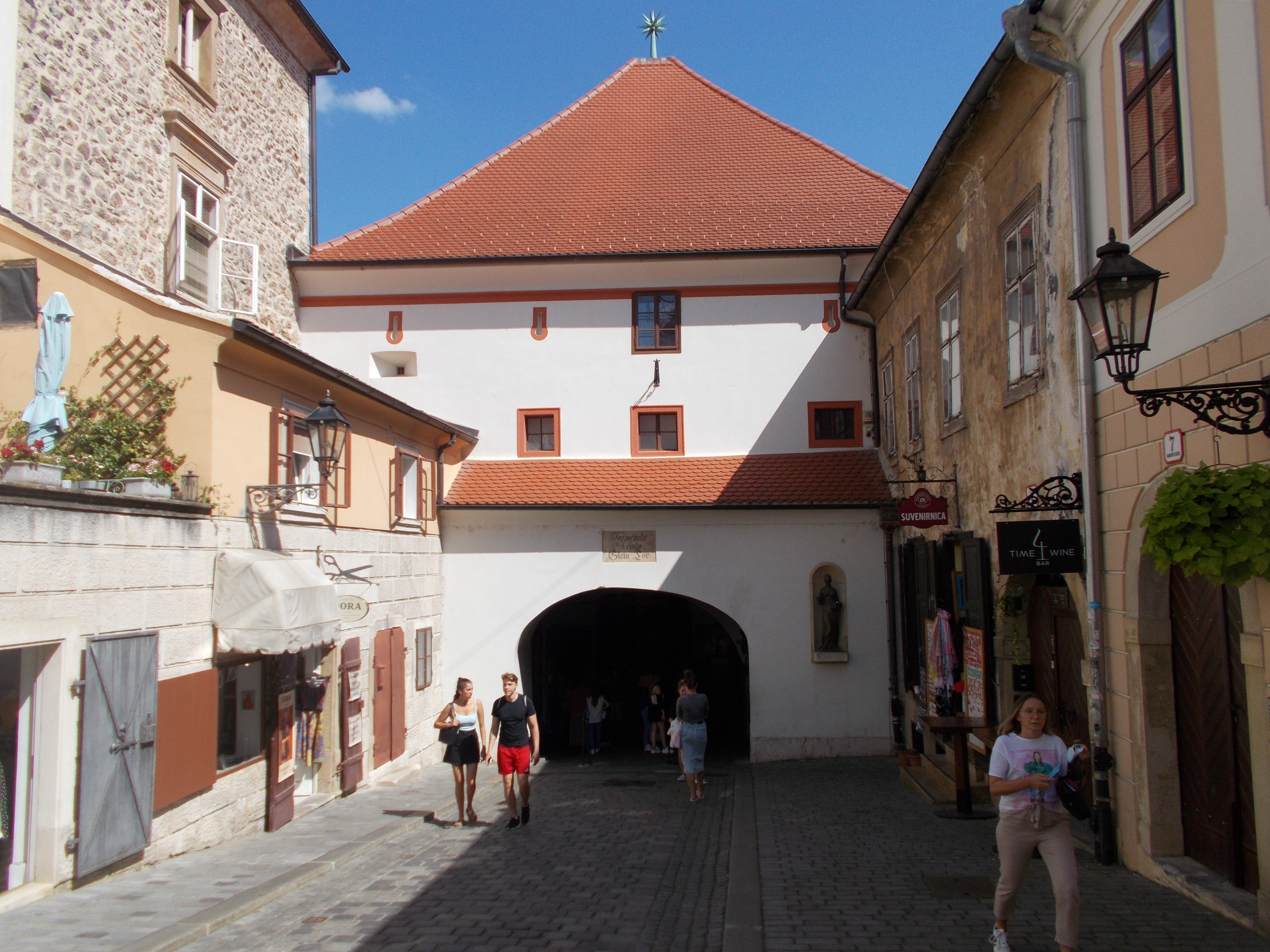
Stone Gate; its present-day appearance dates back to the 18th century

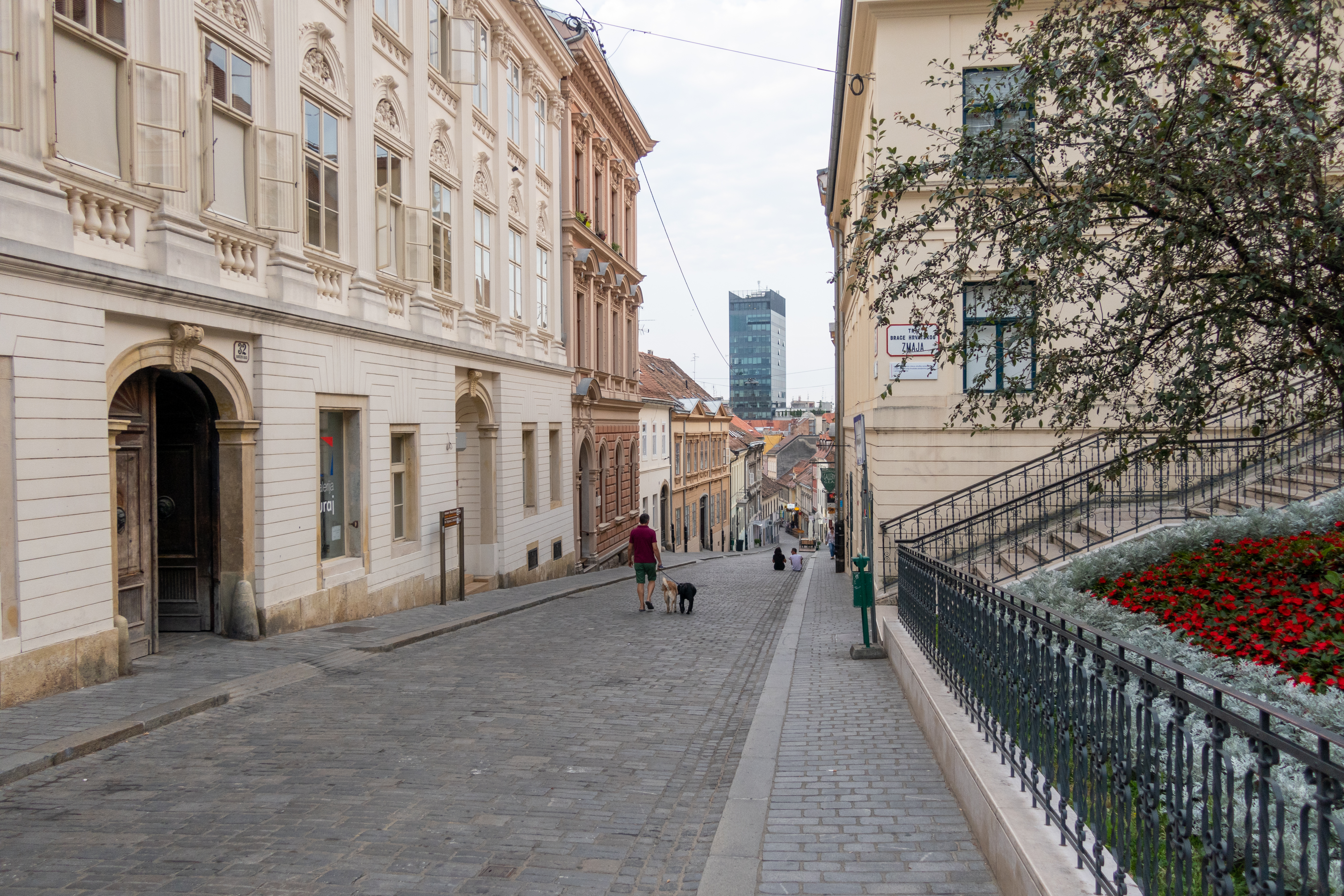
View from Upper Town to Lower Town (Downtown)

==== Twin towns – sister cities ====
Zagreb is twinned with the following towns and cities:

- Bologna, Italy (since 1963)
- Mainz, Germany (since 1967)
- Saint Petersburg, Russia (since 1968)
- Tromsø, Norway (since 1971)
- Buenos Aires, Argentina (since 1972)
- Kyoto, Japan (since 1972)
- Lisbon, Portugal (since 1977)
- Pittsburgh, United States (since 1980)
- Shanghai, China (since 1980)
- Budapest, Hungary (since 1994)
- La Paz, Bolivia (since 2000)
- Sarajevo, Bosnia and Herzegovina (since 2001)
- Ljubljana, Slovenia (since 2001)
- Podgorica, Montenegro (since 2006)
- Tabriz, Iran (since 2006)
- Ankara, Turkey (since 2008)
- London, United Kingdom (since 2009)
- Skopje, Macedonia (since 2011)
- Warsaw, Poland (since 2011)
- Pristina, Kosovo (since 2012)
- Astana, Kazakhstan (since 2014)
- Rome, Italy (since 2014)
- Vienna, Austria (since 2014)
- Petrinja, Croatia (since 2015)
- Vukovar, Croatia (since 2016)
- Xiangyang, China (since 2017)

==== Partner cities ====
The city has partnership arrangements with:

- Kraków, Poland (since 1975)
- Tirana, Albania
- Pécs, Hungary
- Kyiv, Ukraine (since 2024)

== Culture ==
=== Tourism ===
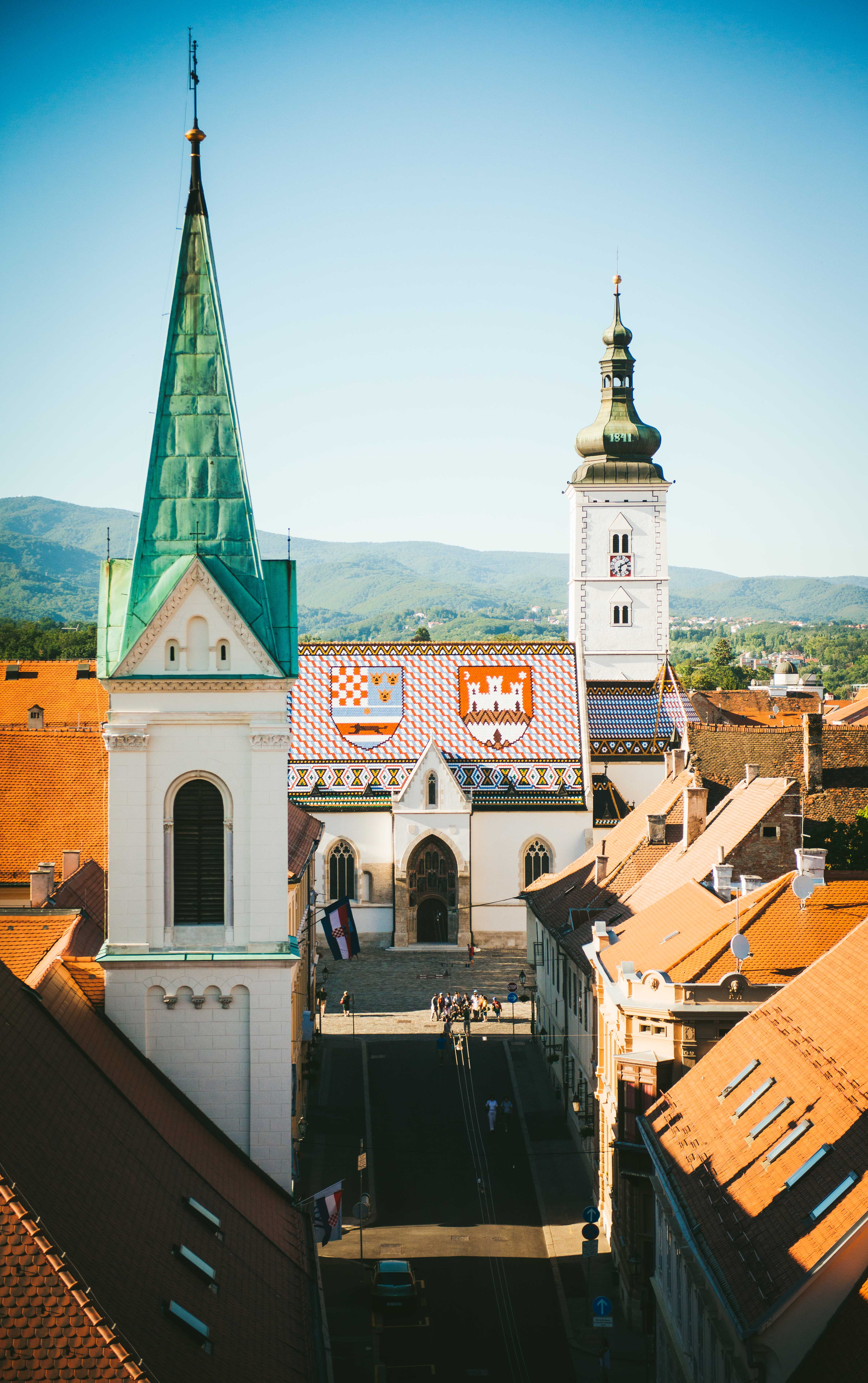
View of the St. Mark's Church with the famous colourful roof representing the coat of arms of the Triune Kingdom of Croatia, Dalmatia and Slavonia (left), and the City of Zagreb (right)

Zagreb is an important tourist centre, not only in terms of passengers travelling from the rest of Europe to the Adriatic Sea but also as a travel destination itself. Since the end of the war, it has attracted close to a million visitors annually, mainly from Austria, Germany, and Italy, and in recent years many tourists from far east (South Korea, Japan, China, and last two years, from India). Due to its location and tourism boom during Austria-Hungary, Zagreb saw an increase in need of accommodation, therefore the first registered hotel, Palace Hotel was built in 1907. Today it is an important tourist destination, not only in Croatia, but considering the whole region of southeastern Europe. There are many interesting sights and happenings for tourists to attend in Zagreb, for example, the two statues of Saint George, one at the Republic of Croatia Square, the other at the Stone Gate, where the image of the Virgin Mary is said to be the only thing that did not burn in the 17th-century fire. Also, there is an art installation starting in the Bogovićeva Street, called Nine Views. Zagreb is also famous for its award-winning Christmas market that had been named the one in Europe for three consecutive years (2015, 2016 and 2017) by European Best Destinations.

The capital is also known for its many restaurants that serve not only traditional Croatian food and classic dishes. In addition to that, a lot of international hotel chains are offering their accommodations in Zagreb.

The historical part of the city to the north of Ban Jelačić Square is composed of the Gornji Grad and Kaptol, a medieval urban complex of churches, palaces, museums, galleries and government buildings that are popular with tourists on sightseeing tours. The historic district can be reached on foot, starting from the Ban Jelačić Square, the centre of Zagreb, or by a funicular on nearby Tomićeva Street. Each Saturday, (from April until the end of September), on St. Mark's Square in the Upper Town, tourists can meet members of the Order of The Silver Dragon (Red Srebrnog Zmaja), who reenact famous historical conflicts between Gradec and Kaptol.

Some famous Zagreb souvenirs are the tie or cravat, an accessory named after Croats who wore characteristic scarves around their necks in the Thirty Years' War in the 17th century, and the ball-point pen, a tool developed from the inventions by Slavoljub Eduard Penkala, an inventor and a citizen of Zagreb.

In 2010 more than 600,000 tourists visited the city, with a 10% increase seen in 2011. In 2012 a total of 675,707 tourists visited the city. A record number of tourists visited Zagreb in 2017, 1,286,087, up 16% compared to the year before, which generated 2,263,758 overnight stays, up 14.8%.

=== Gastronomy ===
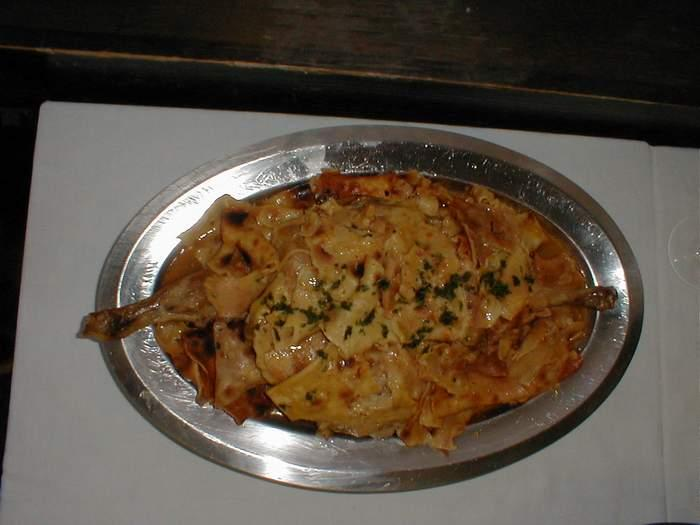
Turkey served with mlinci

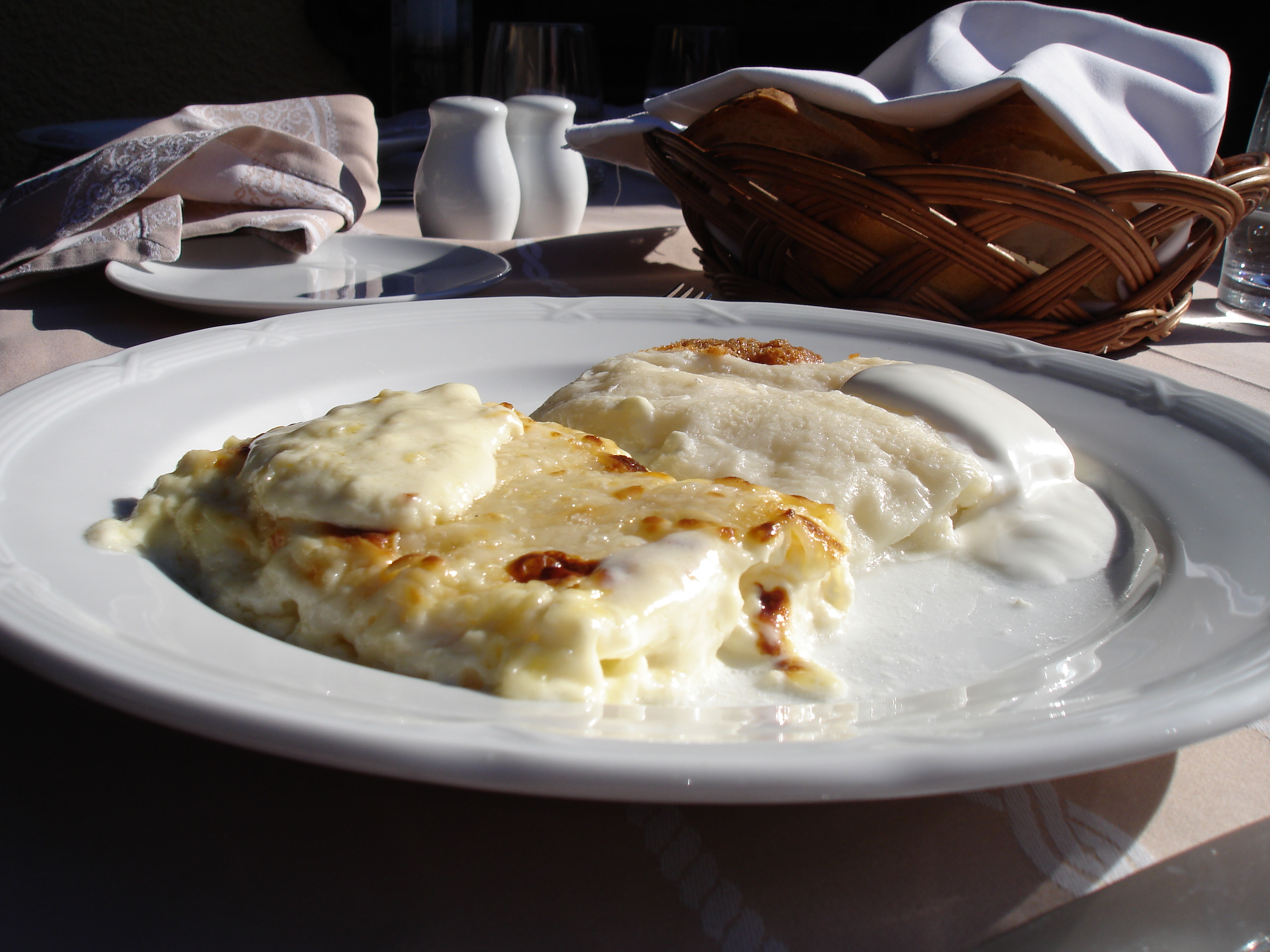
Štrukli

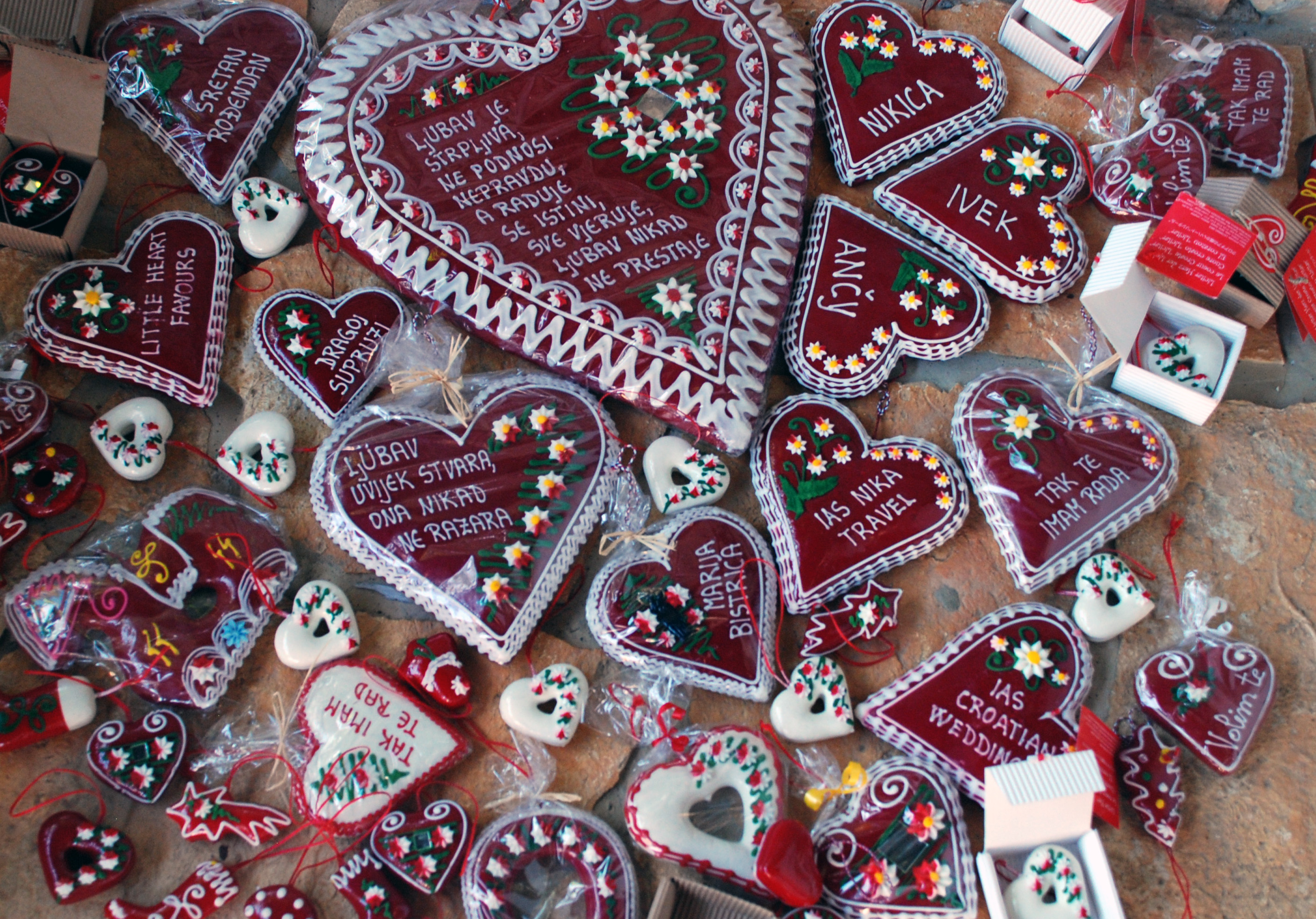
Licitar hearts

Domestic dishes include turkey, duck or goose with mlinci (flat pasta, soaked in roast juices), famous zagrebački odrezak (type of cordon bleu), faširanci (fried minced meat mixed with onions and bread crumbs), and sarma (sauerkraut rolls filed with minced pork meat and rice, served with mashed potato). Strudel dishes include štrukli, cottage cheese strudels, and bučnica, a strudel with pumpkin or other fillings (dependent on the region). Cottage cheese with cream is a side dish that is eaten for breakfast. Desserts include kremšnite, custard slices in flaky pastry, and orehnjača, traditional walnut rolls. Licitar, often called licitar's heart, is a colorfully decorated biscuit made of sweet honey dough, written across with poems, traditional names or citations. Some are made out of permanent materials to be sold as souvenirs.

Zagreb is home to two Michelin star restaurants. Many restaurants offer various specialties of national and international cuisine. Bakeries sell regional pastries like burek, strudels and pies. "Pečenjara" are restaurants specialized in serving grilled meats such as ćevapi, patties and lamb. "Špica" refers to a coffee break with friends at cafes in the city centre, and is usually paired with dressing well. It is busiest on Saturdays around noon, when many "celebrities" can be seen walking in the city centre.

=== Cultural institutions ===
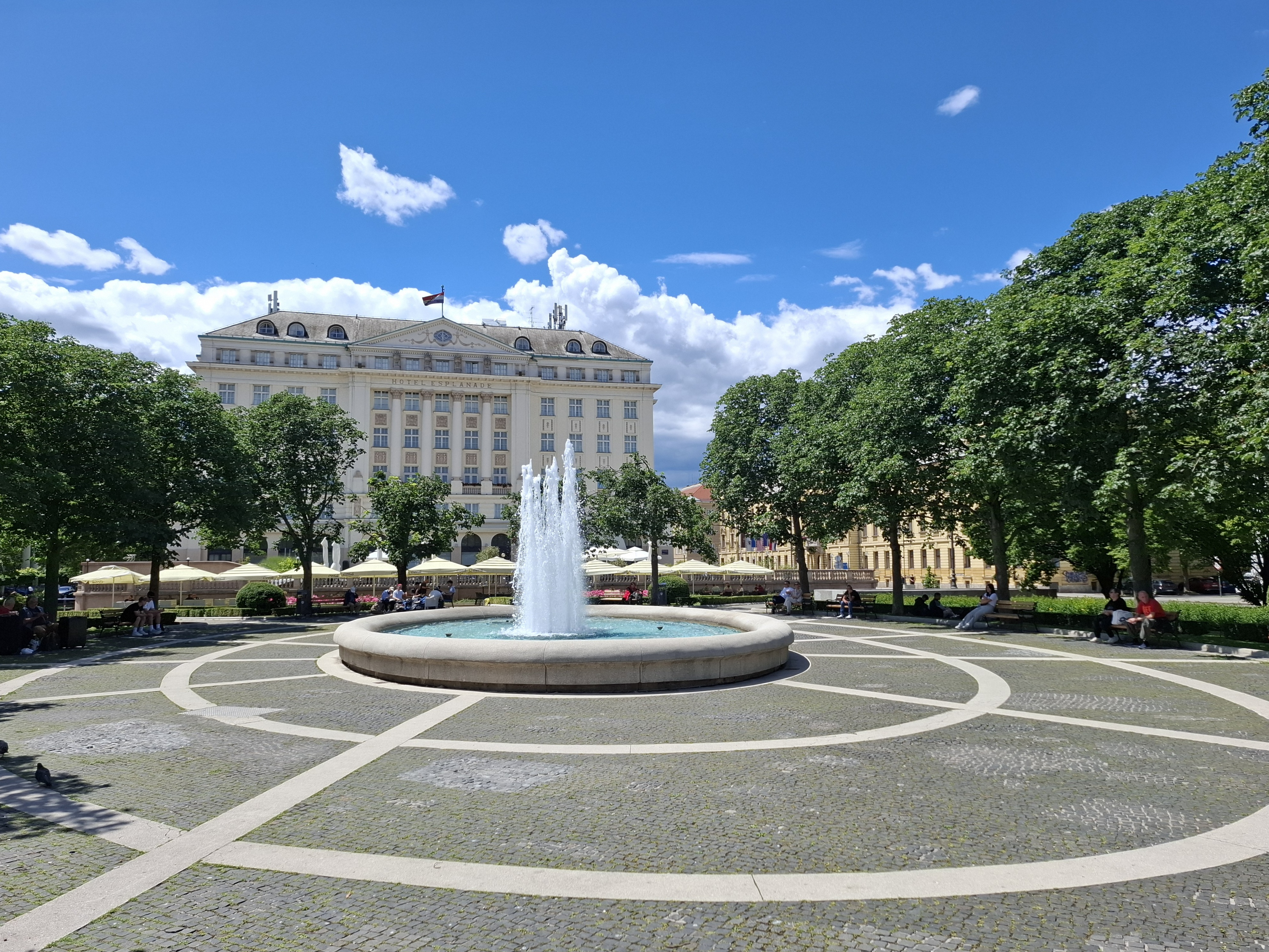
Esplanade Hotel

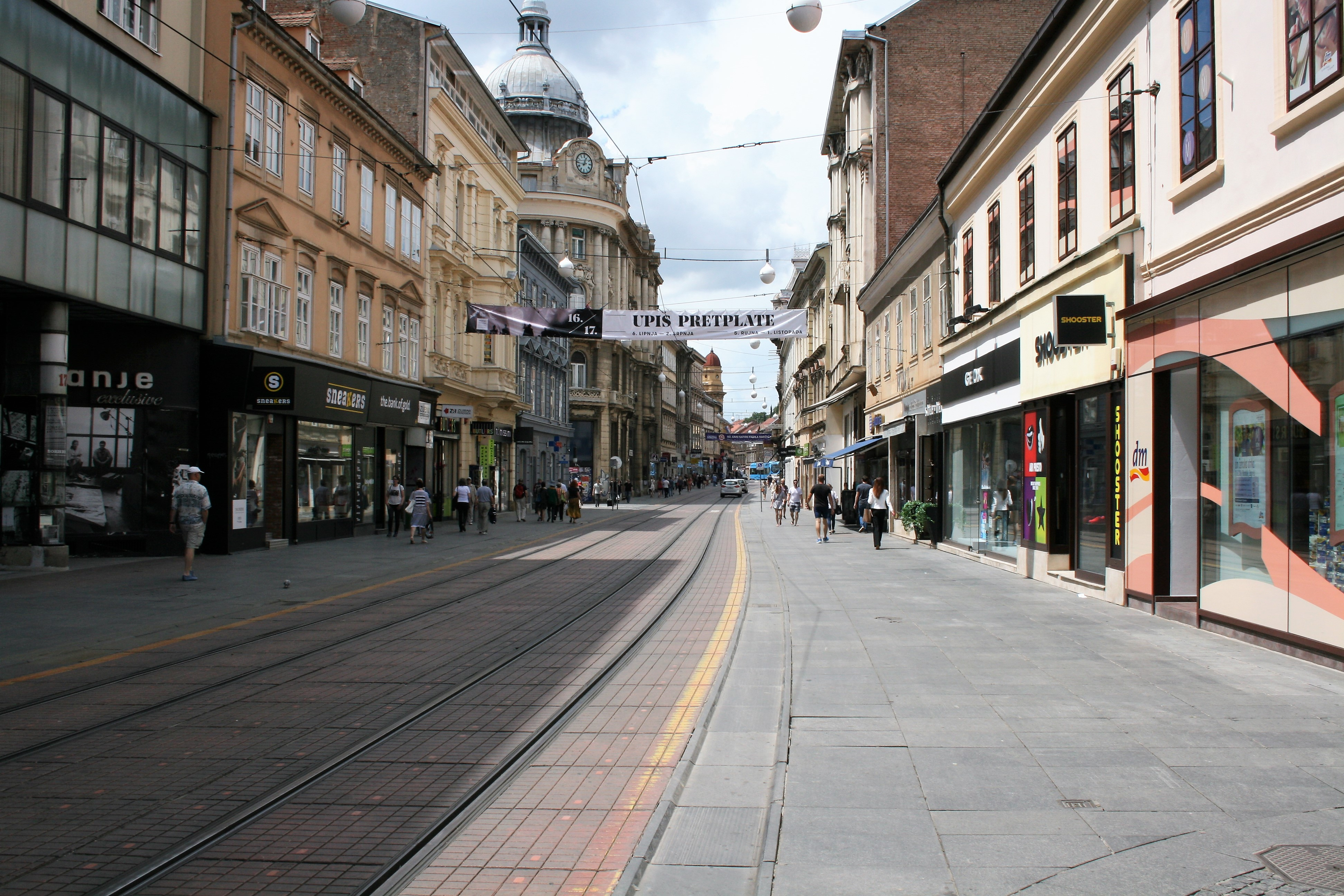
Ilica, the famous shopping street of the city

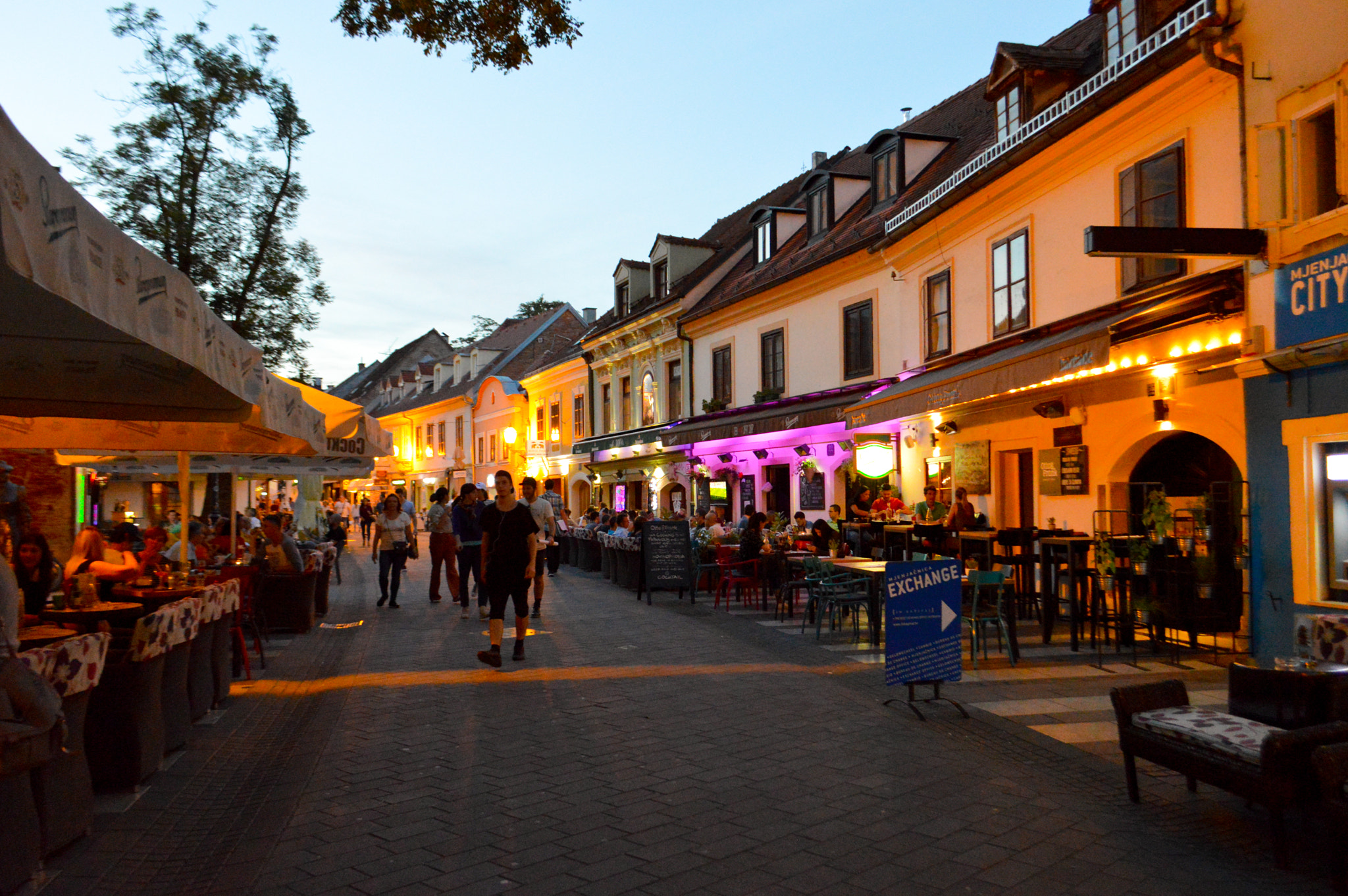
Tkalčićeva Street, commonly known as "Tkalča" has many cafes, bars and restaurants of local and foreign cuisine

Zagreb's museums reflect the history, art, and culture not only of Zagreb and Croatia, but also of Europe and the world. Around thirty collections in museums and galleries comprise more than 3.6 million various exhibits, excluding church and private collections.

The Archaeological Museum collections, today consisting of nearly 450,000 varied archaeological artefacts and monuments, have been gathered over the years from many different sources. These holdings include evidence of Croatian presence in the area. The most famous are the Egyptian collection, the Zagreb mummy and bandages with the oldest Etruscan inscription in the world (Liber Linteus Zagrabiensis), as well as the numismatic collection.

The Modern Gallery (Croatian: Moderna galerija) holds the most important and comprehensive collection of paintings, sculptures and drawings by 19th- and 20th-century Croatian artists. The collection numbers more than 10,000 works of art, housed since 1934 in the historic Vranyczany Palace in the centre of Zagreb, overlooking the Zrinjevac Park. A secondary gallery is the Josip Račić Studio.

The Croatian Natural History Museum holds one of the world's most important collections of Neanderthal remains found at one site. These are the remains, stone weapons, and tools of prehistoric Krapina man. The holdings of the Croatian Natural History Museum comprise more than 250,000 specimens distributed among various collections.

The Technical Museum was founded in 1954 and it maintains the oldest preserved machine in the area, dating from 1830, which is still operational. The museum exhibits numerous historic aircraft, cars, machinery and equipment. There are some distinct sections in the museum: the Planetarium, the Apisarium, the Mine (model of mines for coal, iron and non-ferrous metals, about 300 m (980 ft) long), and the Nikola Tesla study.

The Museum of the City of Zagreb was established in 1907 by the Association of the Braća Hrvatskog Zmaja. It is located in a restored monumental complex (Popov toranj, the Observatory, Zakmardi Granary) of the former Convent of the Poor Clares, of 1650. The Museum deals with topics from the cultural, artistic, economic and political history of the city spanning from Roman finds to the modern period. The holdings comprise over 80,000 items arranged systematically into collections of artistic and mundane objects characteristic of the city and its history.

The Arts and Crafts Museum was founded in 1880 with the intention of preserving the works of art and craft against the new predominance of industrial products. With its 160,000 exhibits, the Arts and Crafts Museum is a national-level museum for artistic production and the history of material culture in Croatia.

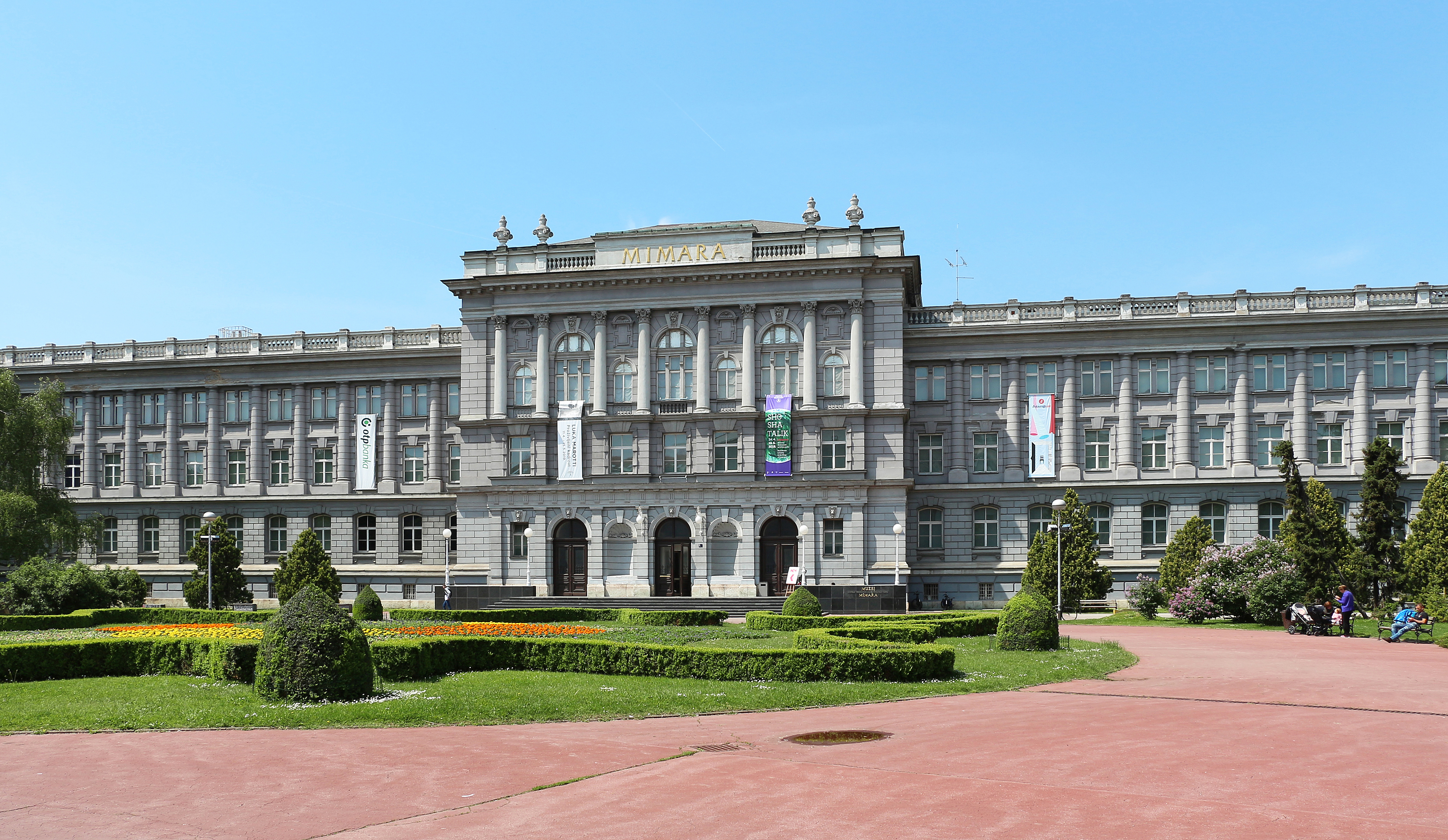
Mimara Museum

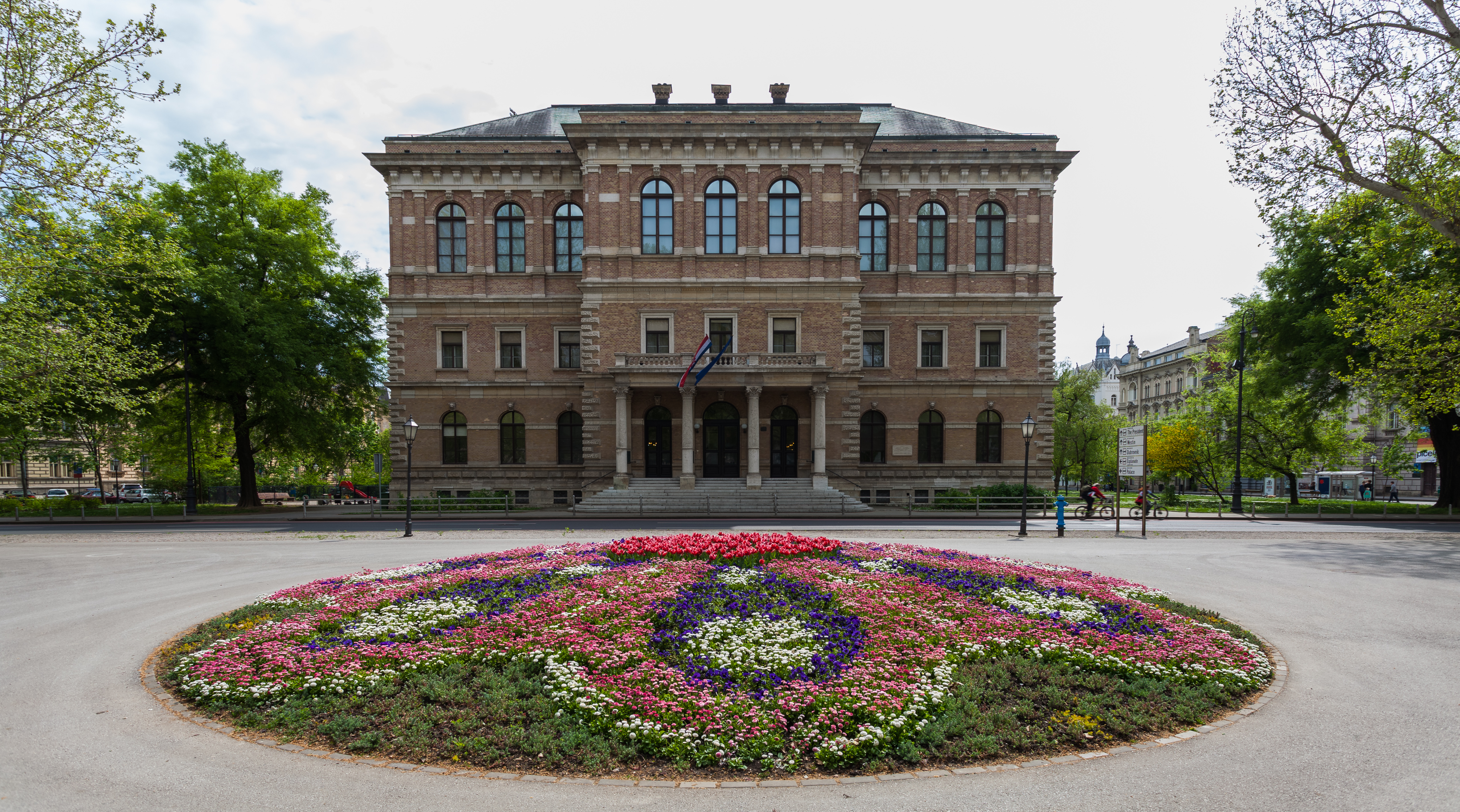
Strossmayer Gallery of Old Masters

The Ethnographic Museum was founded in 1919. It lies in the fine Secession building of the one-time Trades Hall of 1903. The ample holdings of about 80,000 items cover the ethnographic heritage of Croatia, classified in three cultural zones: the Pannonian, Dinaric and Adriatic.

The Mimara Museum an art museum, that was founded with a donation from Ante Topić Mimara and opened to the public in 1987. It is located in a late 19th-century neo-Renaissance palace. The holdings comprise 3,750 works of art of various techniques and materials, and different cultures and civilizations, including paintings from great European masters like: Rubens, Velázquez, Renoir, Goya, Hieronymus Bosch, Veronese, Manet, Degas, van Dyck and many others.

The Croatian Museum of Naïve Art is one of the first museums of naïve art in the world. The museum holds works of Croatian naïve expression of the 20th century. It is located in the 18th-century Raffay Palace in the Gornji Grad. The museum holdings consist of almost 2000 works of art – paintings, sculptures, drawings, and prints, mainly by Croatians but also by other well-known world artists. From time to time, the museum organizes topics and retrospective exhibitions by naïve artists, expert meetings and educational workshops and playrooms.

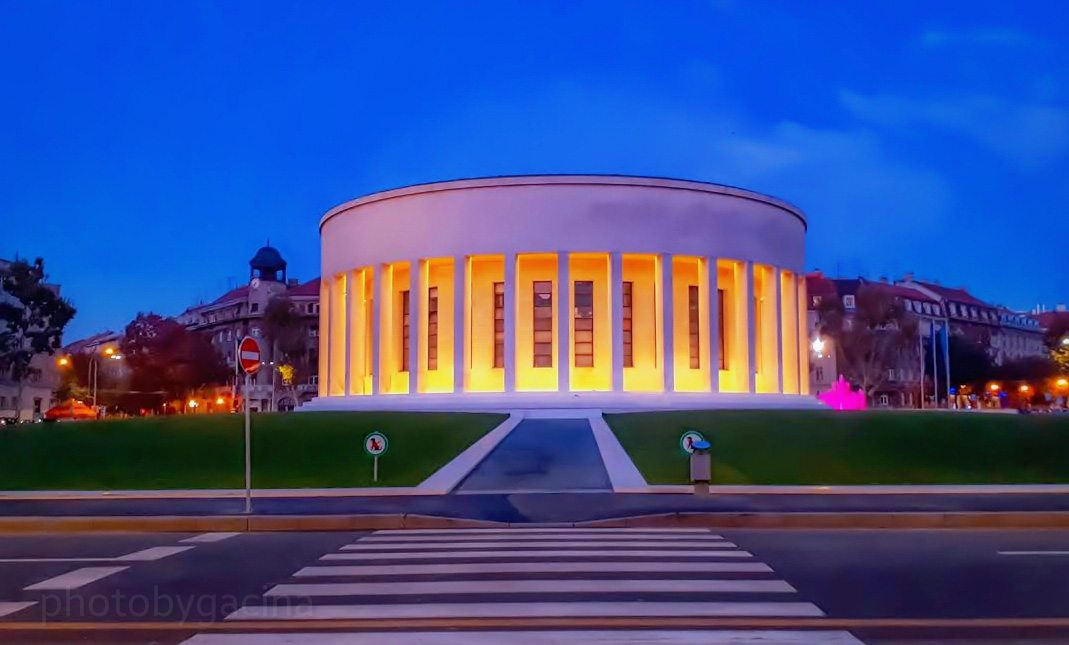
Meštrović Pavilion

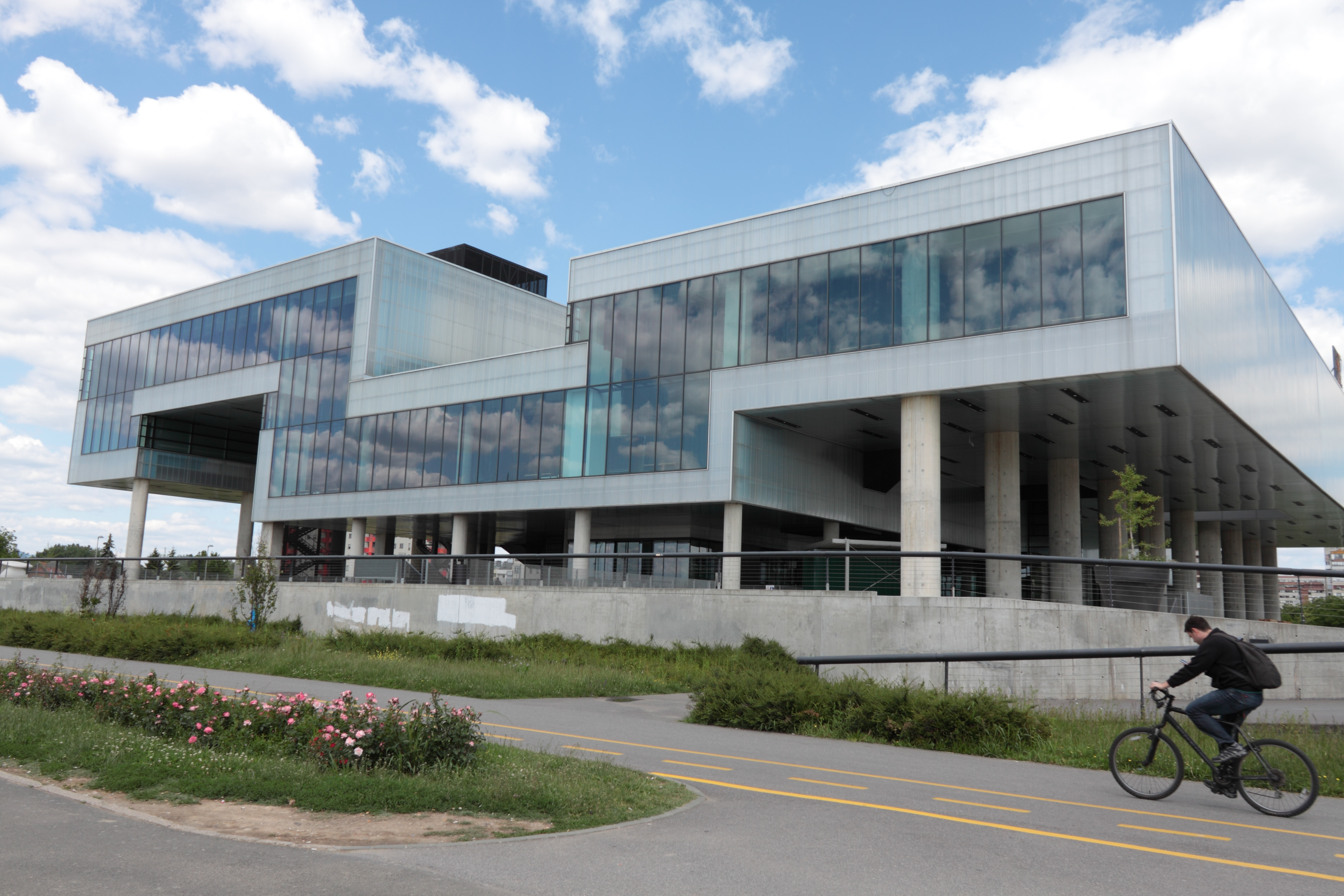
Museum of Contemporary Art

The Museum of Contemporary Art was founded in 1954. Its new building hosts a rich collection of Croatian and international contemporary visual art which has been collected throughout the decades from the nineteen-fifties until today. The museum is located in the centre of Novi Zagreb and opened in 2009. The old location is now part of the Kulmer Palace in the Gornji Grad.

The Institute for Contemporary Art (Institut za suvremenu umjetnost), successor to the Soros Center for Contemporary Art – Zagreb (SCCA – Zagreb), was founded in 1993, and registered as an independent nonprofit organization in 1998. It was founded and run by art historians, curators, artists, photographers, designers, publishers, academics, and journalists, and initially located at the Museum of Contemporary Art. After moving a number of times, the institute has a gallery at the Academia Moderna. Its aims are to promote contemporary Croatian artists and the visual and other creative arts; to start documenting contemporary artists; and to build a body of contemporary art. It established the Radoslav Putar Award in 2002.

The Strossmayer Gallery of Old Masters offers permanent holdings presenting European paintings from the 14th to 19th centuries, and the Ivan Meštrović Studio, with sculptures, drawings, lithography portfolios and other items, was a donation of this great artist to his homeland. The Museum and Gallery Center introduces on various occasions the Croatian and foreign cultural and artistic heritage.

The Art Pavilion by Viennese architects Hellmer and Fellmer who were the most famous designers of theatres in Central Europe is a neo-classical exhibition complex and one of the landmarks of the downtown. The exhibitions are also held in the Meštrović building on the Square of the Victims of Fascism – the Home of Croatian Fine Artists. The World Center "Wonder of Croatian Naïve Art" exhibits masterpieces of Croatian naïve art as well as the works of a new generation of artists. The Modern Gallery comprises all relevant fine artists of the 19th and 20th centuries. The Museum of Broken Relationships at 2 Ćirilometodska holds people's mementos of past relationships. It is the first private museum in the country. Lauba House presents works from the Filip Trade Collection, a large private collection of modern and contemporary Croatian art and current artistic production.

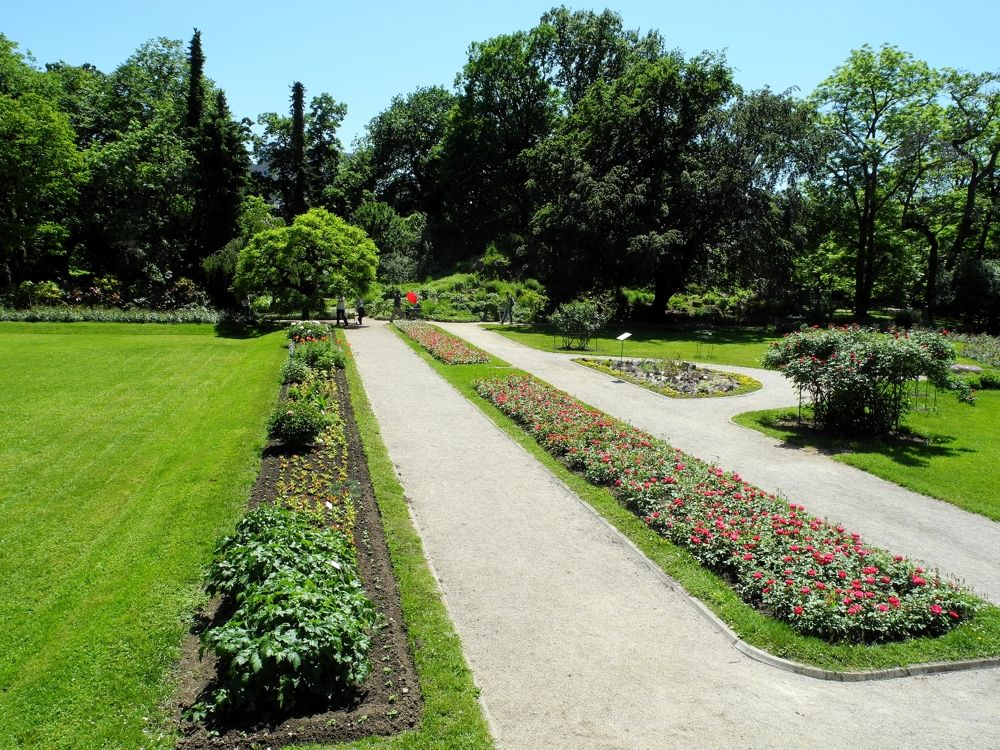
Zagreb Botanical Garden

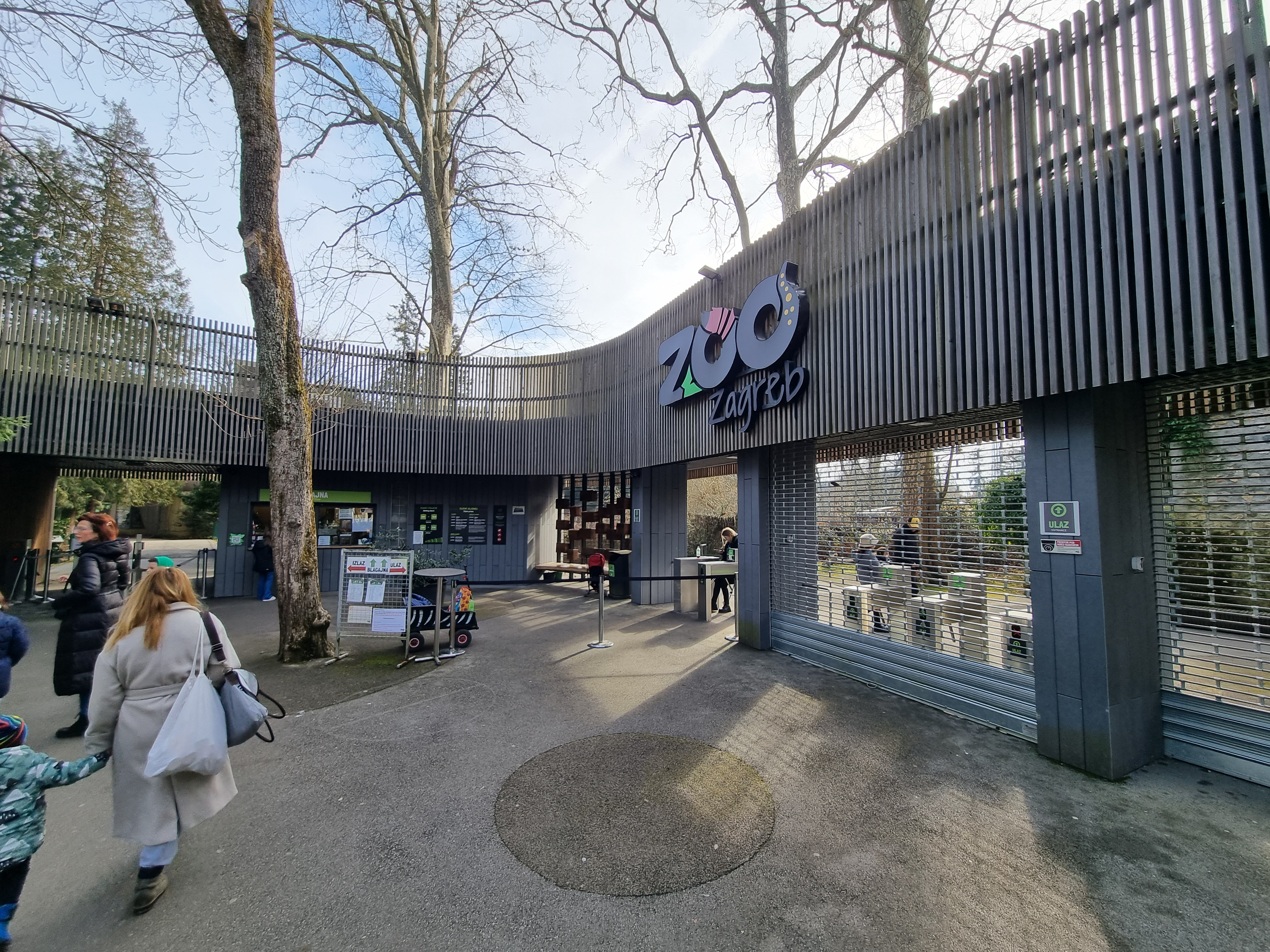
Zagreb Zoo

Other museums and galleries are also found in the Croatian School Museum, the Croatian Hunting Museum, the Croatian Sports Museum, the Croatian Post and Telecommunications Museum, the HAZU (Croatian Academy of Sciences and Arts) Glyptotheque (collection of monuments), and the HAZU Graphics Cabinet.

There are five castles in Zagreb: Dvorac Brezovica, Kašina (Castrum antiquum Paganorum), Medvedgrad, Susedgrad and Kulmerovi dvori.

Zagreb Zoo is a 7-hectare zoo located in Maksimir Park opened in 1925. It holds 6754 animals from more than 370 species from all around the world, and is the most visited zoo in Croatia with almost half of million visitors in 2023.

=== Events ===
Zagreb has hosted some of the most popular mainstream musical artists in recent years, including those of Queen, Rolling Stones, U2, Guns N' Roses, Eric Clapton, Deep Purple, Bob Dylan, David Bowie, Elton John, Roger Waters, Depeche Mode, Prodigy, Beyoncé, Lady Gaga, Britney Spears, Ed Sheeran, Justin Bieber, Shakira, Nick Cave, Jamiroquai, George Michael, Sade, Sting, Rod Stewart, Eros Ramazzotti, Manu Chao, Massive Attack, Andrea Bocelli, Metallica, 50 Cent, Snoop Dogg, Duran Duran as well as some of world most recognised underground artists such as Dimmu Borgir, Sepultura, Melvins, Mastodon and more.

Zagreb is also the home of the INmusic festival, one of the biggest open-air festivals in Croatia which is held every year, usually at the end of June, hosting a lot of big names like Hozier, Lily Allen, Arctic Monkeys, Rokia Traoré, Anthrax and many more. There is also the Zagreb Jazz Festival which has featured popular jazz artists like Pat Metheny or Sonny Rollins. Many other festivals occur in Zagreb like Žedno uho featuring indie, rock, metal and electronica artists such as Animal Collective, Melvins, Butthole Surfers, Crippled Black Phoenix, NoMeansNo, The National, Mark Lanegan, Swans, Mudhoney around the clubs and concert halls of Zagreb.

=== Performing arts ===
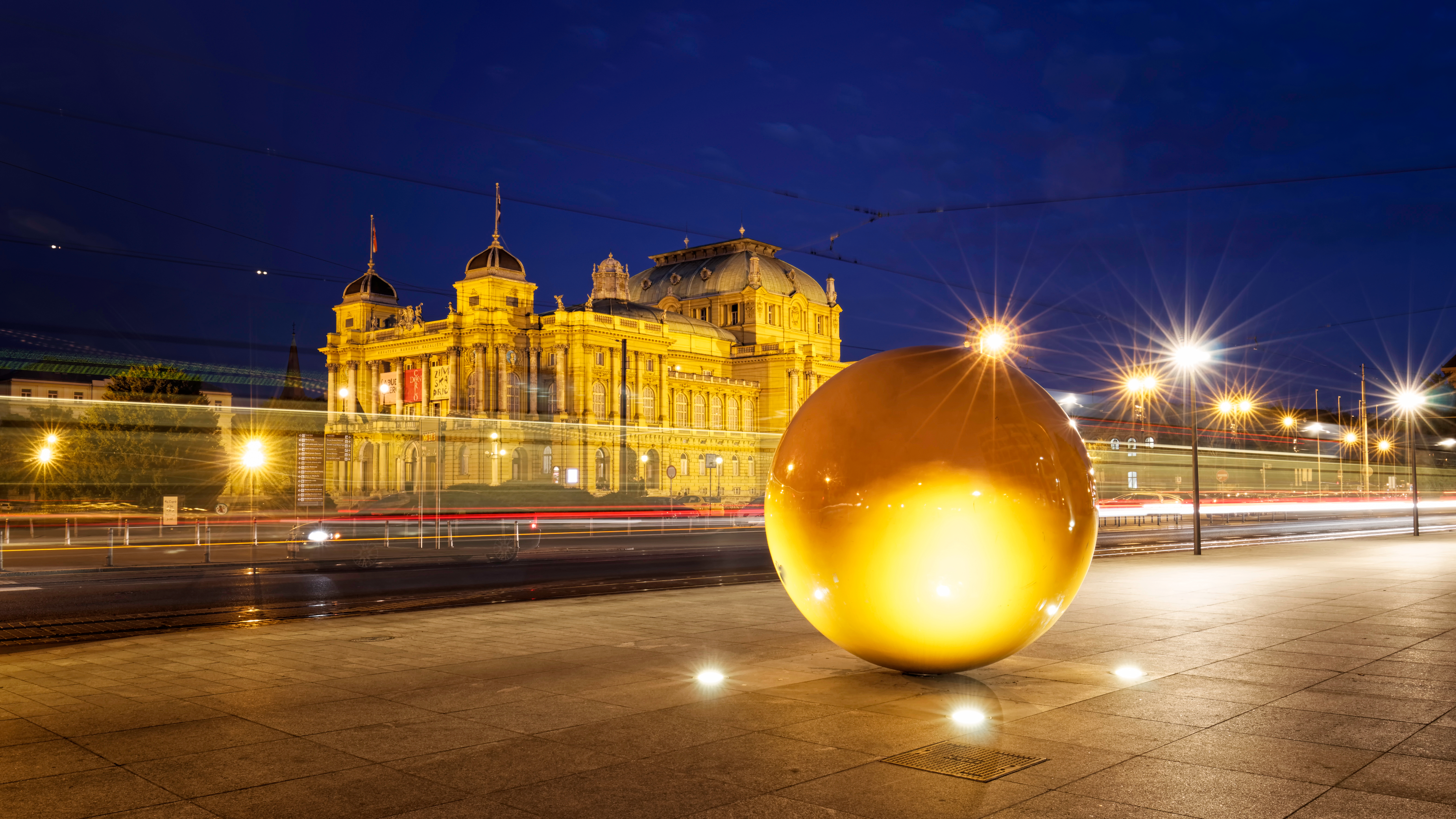
Croatian National Theatre

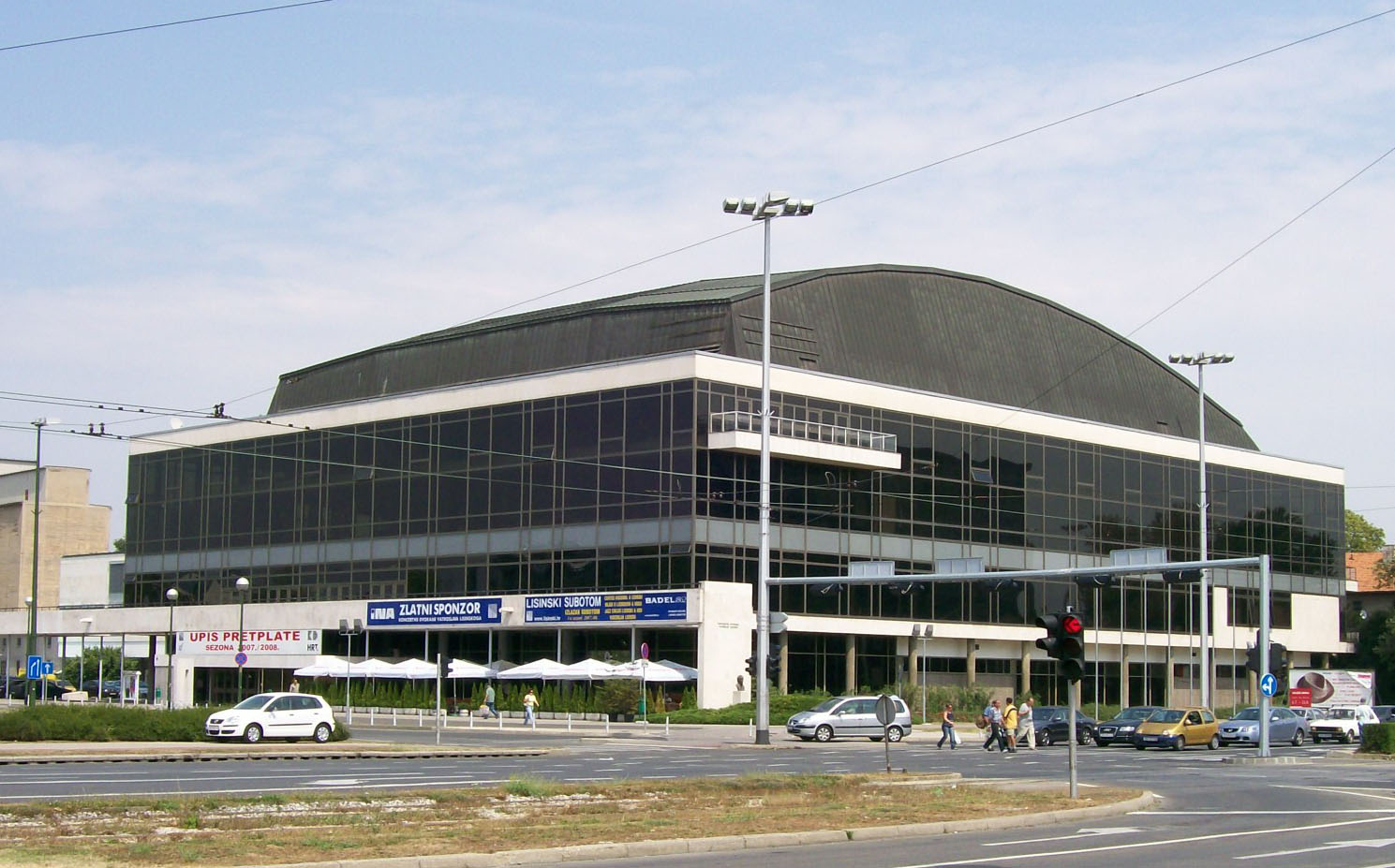
Vatroslav Lisinski Concert Hall

There are about 20 permanent or seasonal theatres and stages. The Croatian National Theater in Zagreb was built in 1895 and opened by emperor Franz Joseph I of Austria. The most renowned concert hall named "Vatroslav Lisinski", after the composer of the first Croatian opera, was built in 1973.

The World Theatre Festival and International Puppet Festival both take place in Zagreb in September and October.

Animafest, the World Festival of Animated Films, takes place every even-numbered year, and the Music Biennale, the international festival of avant-garde music, every odd-numbered year. It also hosts the annual ZagrebDox documentary film festival. The Festival of the Zagreb Philharmonic and the flowers exhibition Floraart (end of May or beginning of June), the Old-timer Rally annual events. In the summer, theatre performances and concerts, mostly in the Upper Town, are organized either indoors or outdoors. The stage on Opatovina hosts the Zagreb Histrionic Summer theatre events.

Zagreb is also the host of Zagrebfest, the oldest Croatian pop-music festival, as well as of several traditional international sports events and tournaments. The Day of the City of Zagreb on 16 November is celebrated every year with special festivities, especially on the Jarun lake in the southwestern part of the city.

=== Recreation and sports ===
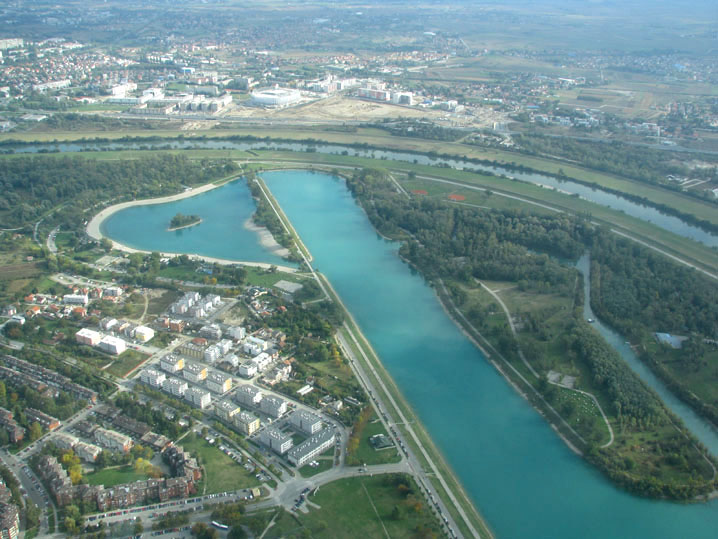
Jarun Lake

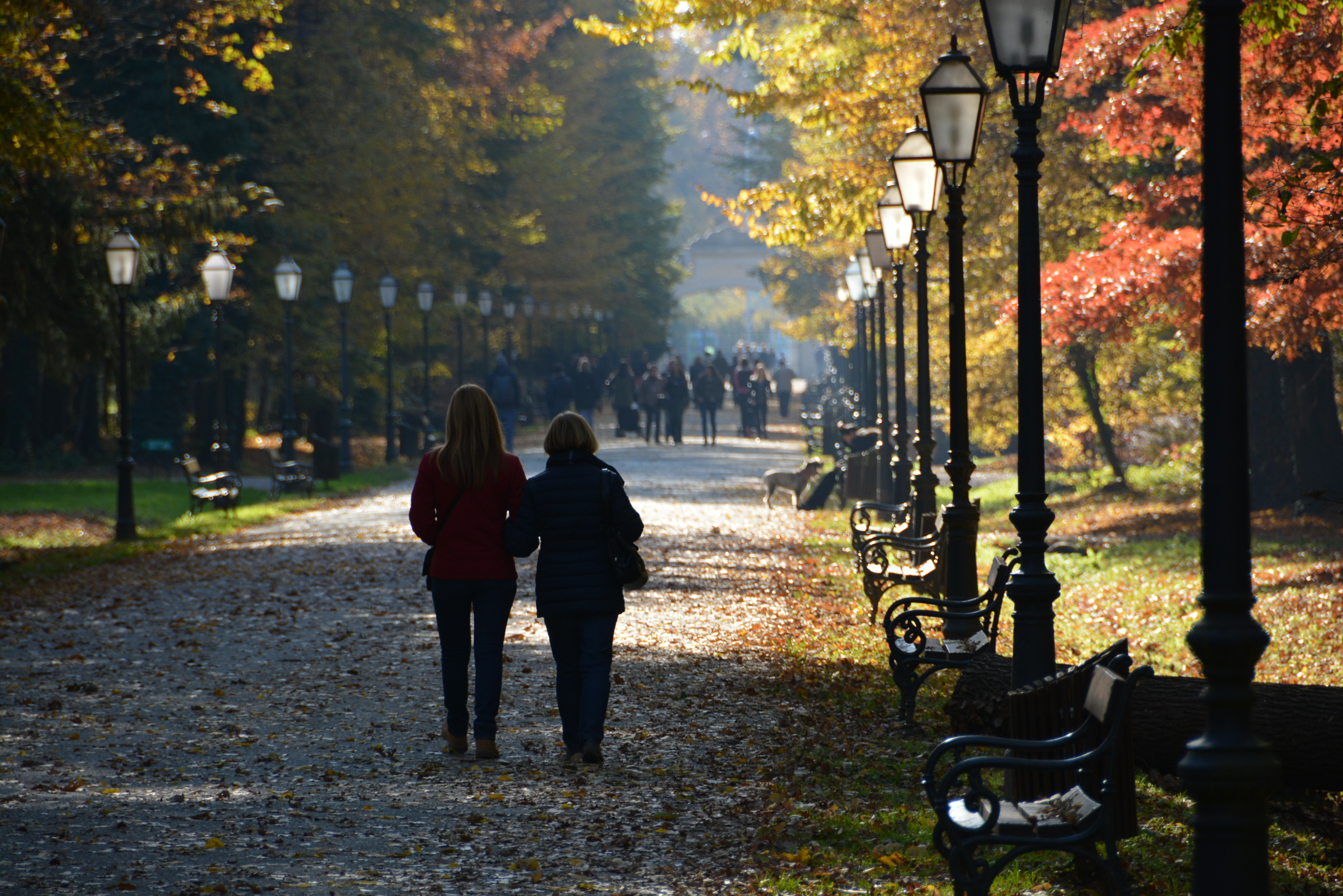
Maksimir Park

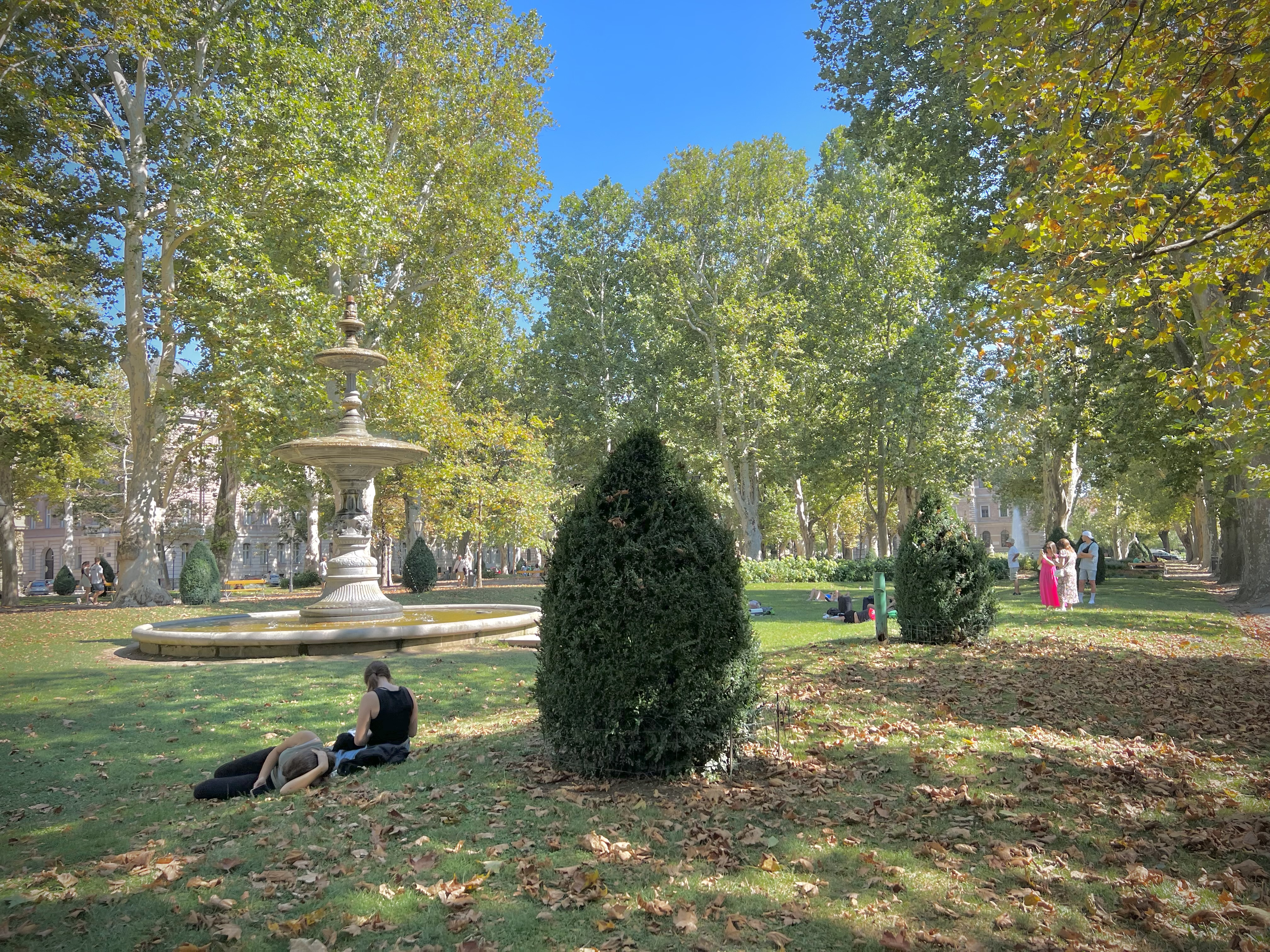
Zrinjevac Park

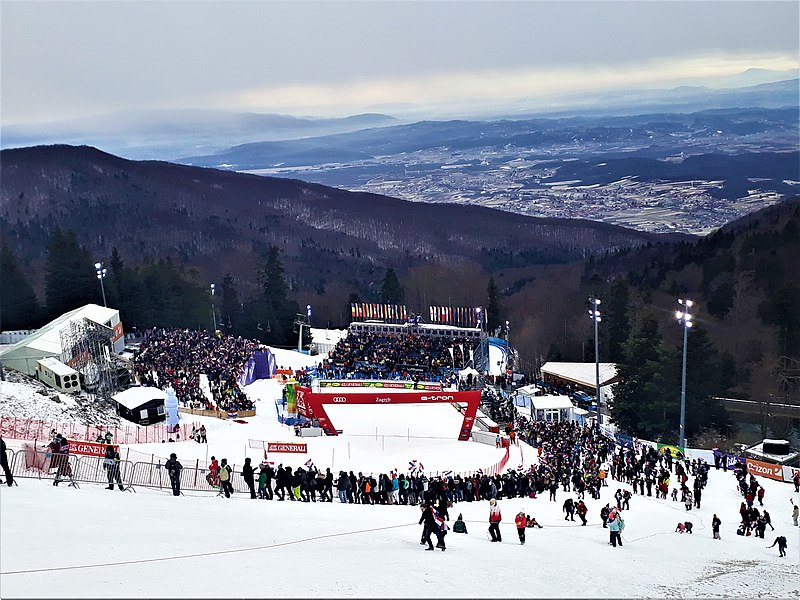
Snow Queen Trophy is a World Cup alpine ski race in Zagreb

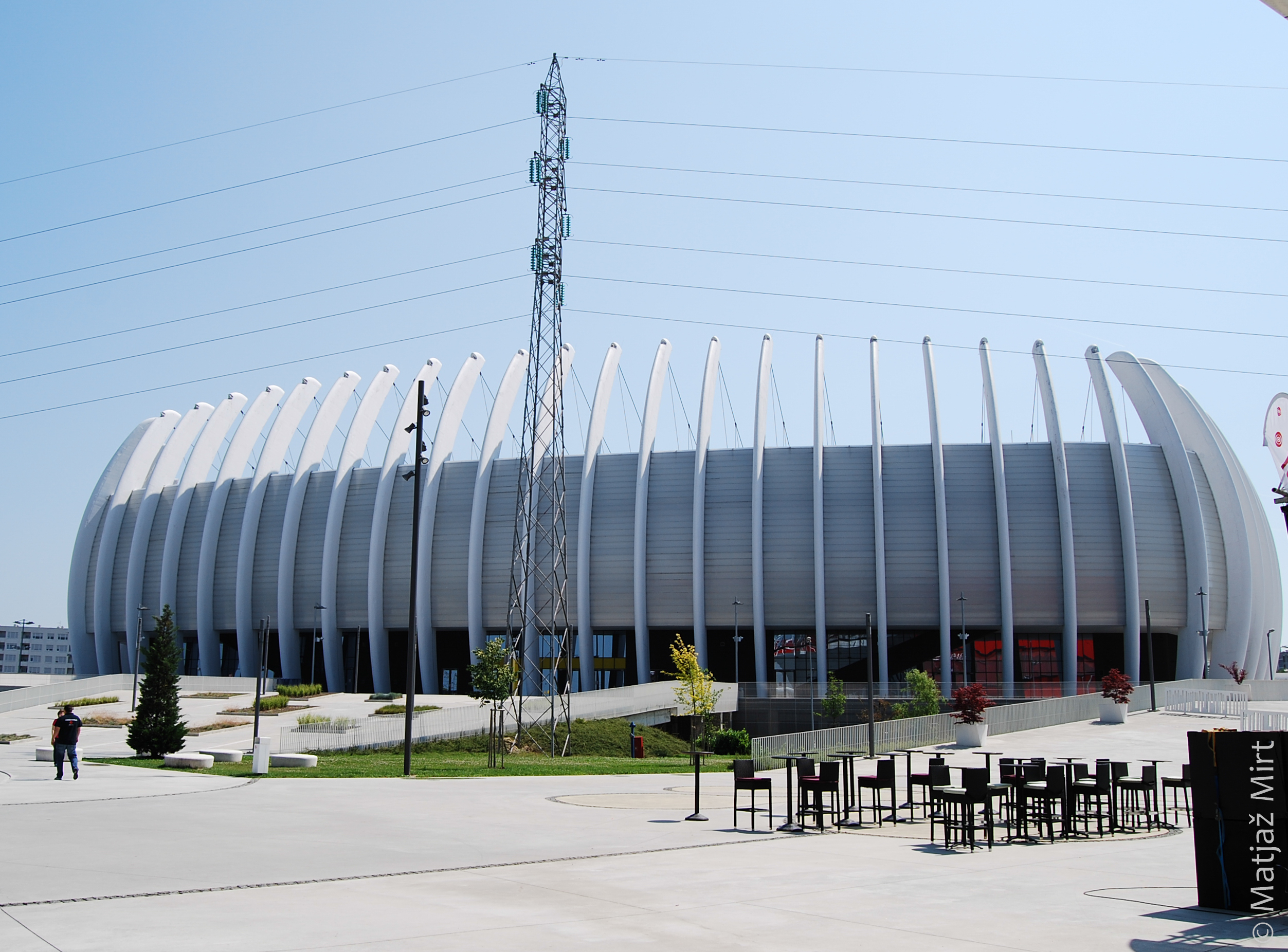
Arena Zagreb

==== Parks ====
Zagreb is home to numerous sports and recreational parks. Recreational Sports Center Jarun, situated on the Jarun Lake in the southwest of the city, has shingle beaches, a regatta course used for training and sports competitions, a jogging and a bike lane around the lake, and several restaurants and night clubs. Its sports and recreation opportunities include swimming, sunbathing, waterskiing, angling, and other water sports, for which it is most popular, but also beach volleyball, football, basketball, handball, table tennis, and mini-golf. To the east in Novi Zagreb lays Bundek, a park with two small lakes near the Sava river, which were created in the 60s because of heavy excavations in the area, from which the material was used to build the Zagreb Fair and the Youth Bridge. The location had then been used until the 1970s, when it went into neglect until its complete renovation in 2006. In the north-east is Maksimir Park, an urban forest that was gifted to the city by bishop Maksimilijan Vrhovac. Because of its many meadows and lakes, which are well connected by a series of pathways, it is a popular place for walking, running and cycling.

==== Sports ====
In northern Trešnjevka lays Dom sportova, a sports centre that features six halls, of which the largest two have a seating capacity of 5,000 and 3,100 people. This centre is used for various sports: basketball, handball, volleyball, hockey, gymnastics, tennis, and others, as well as music events. Sports Park Mladost, situated on the embankment of the Sava river, has an Olympic-size swimming pool, smaller indoor and outdoor swimming pools, a sunbathing terrace, 16 tennis courts as well as basketball, volleyball, handball, football and field hockey courts. A volleyball sports hall is within the park. Sports and recreational centre "Šalata", located in the neighborhood Šalata only a couple hundred meters from the Ban Jelačić Square, includes nine tennis courts, four of which are covered in the winter to protect from the cold, as well as swimming pools which are open during the summer, basketball courts and football fields. Many of the fields are used by sports clubs. Outdoor ice skating is available during the winter. Maksimir Tennis Center, located in the neighborhood of Ravnice, east of downtown, consists of 22 outside and 4 inside tennis courts, and one squash court. There are currently seven pool complexes across the city. Since the city doesn't have many skate parks, skaters can only skate in a few locations in Zagreb, them being Jarun, Špansko and Vrapče (which is a DIY skate park built by volunteers). Zagreb Hippodrome offers recreational horseback riding and horse races, able to house 175 horses. It has been used for mass gatherings and concerts.

Arena Zagreb is the main and the biggest arena in the city, with a total of 16,500 seats. It hosted the 2009 World Men's Handball Championship. The Dražen Petrović Basketball Hall is the home arena of Cibona, one of the main basketball clubs in the city, with a seating capacity of 5017 people. It is located next to the 94 m (308 ft) tall Cibona Tower. The 35,123-seat Maksimir Stadium is the largest stadium in the city and home to Dinamo Zagreb. Opened in 1912, it has undergone many transformations, but was never completely finished. The stadium is located next to the Svetice Recreational and Sports Complex and Maksimir Park.

Most notable sports clubs include football teams GNK Dinamo Zagreb and NK Zagreb, basketball clubs KK Cibona, KK Zagreb, and KK Cedevita, ice hockey club KHL Medveščak Zagreb, handball team RK Zagreb, and water polo club HAVK Mladost.

===== Football =====
Football is a major sport in Zagreb, which is home to several prominent Croatian football clubs, including GNK Dinamo Zagreb.

=== Religion ===
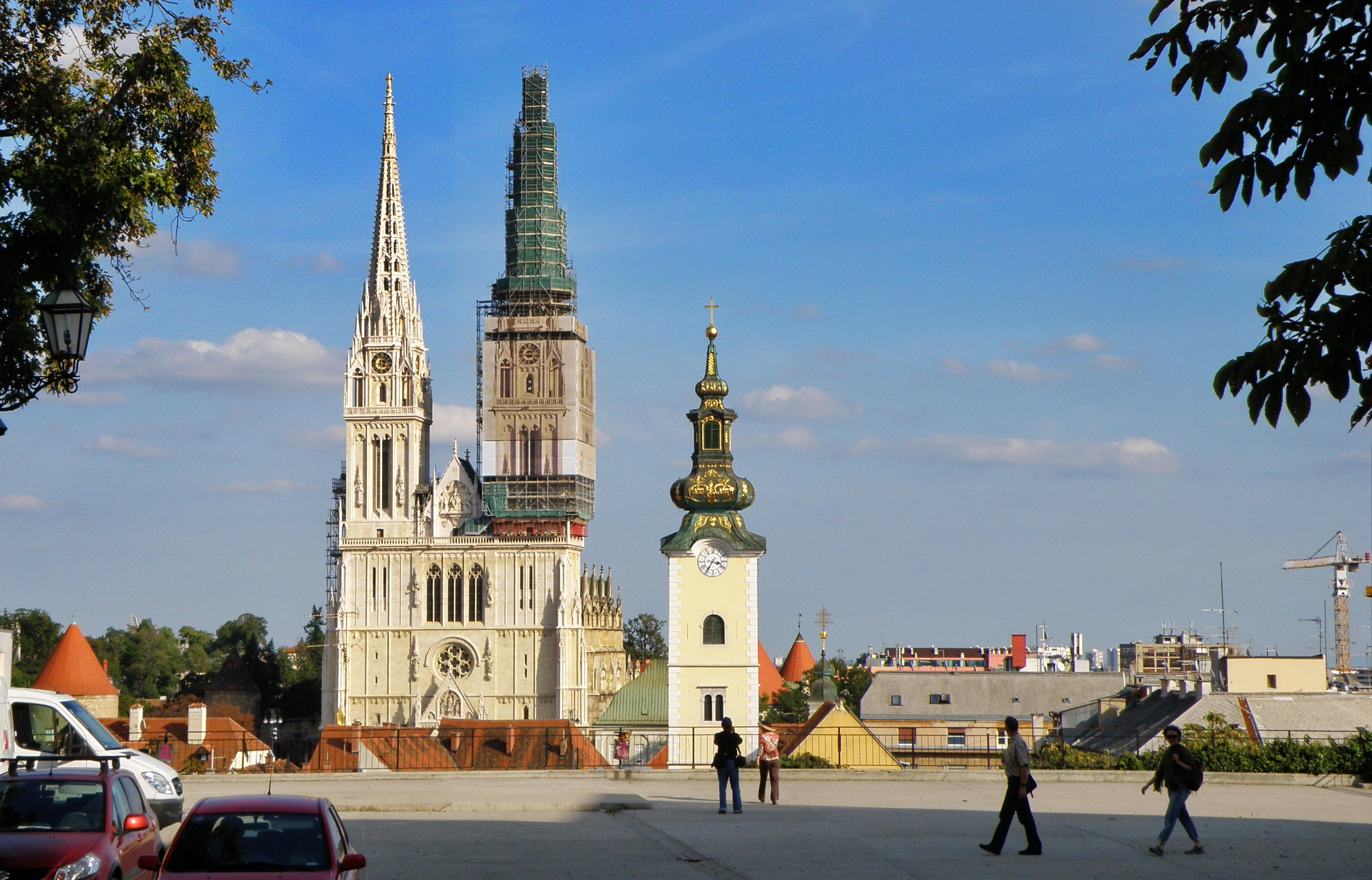
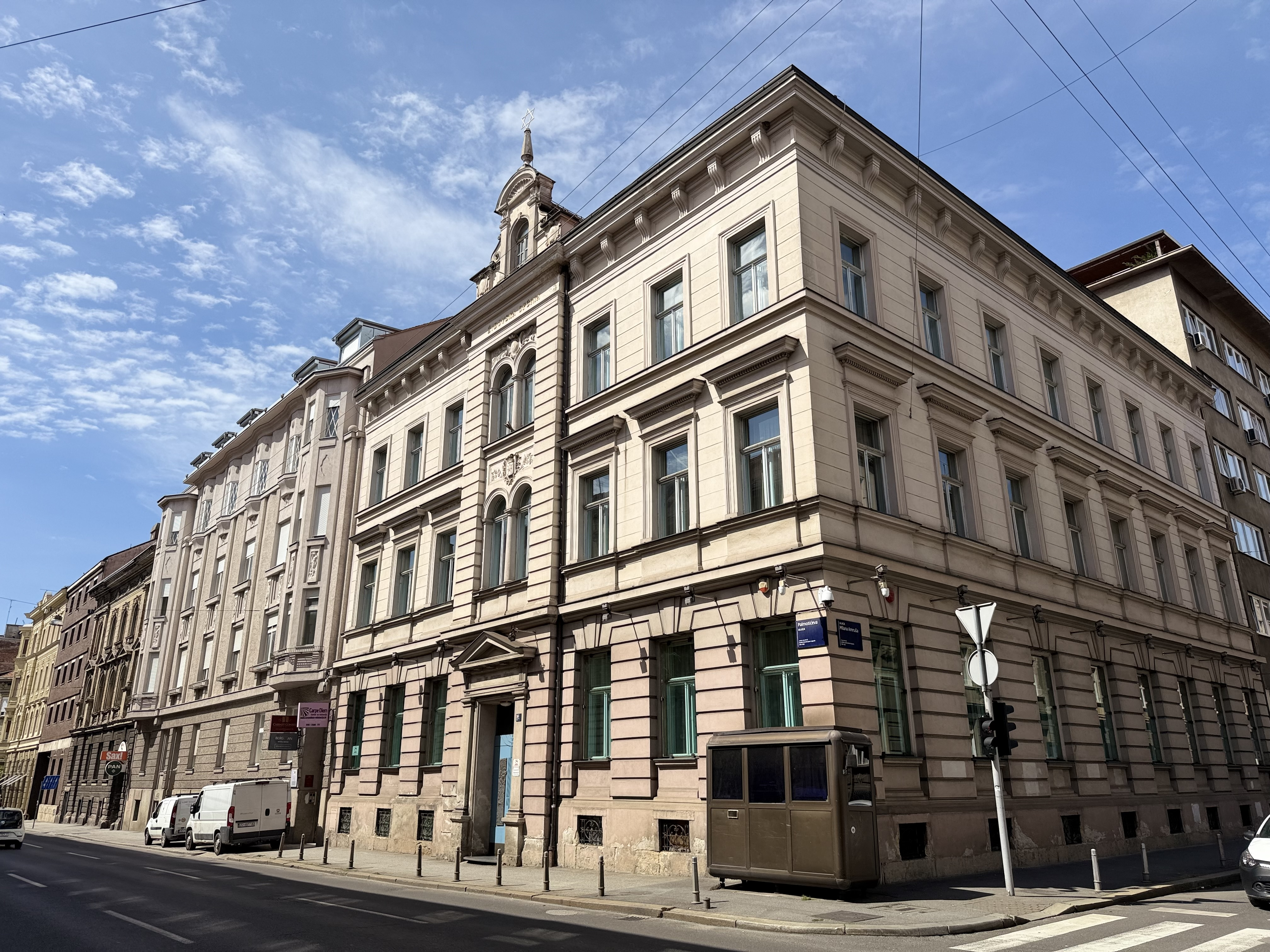
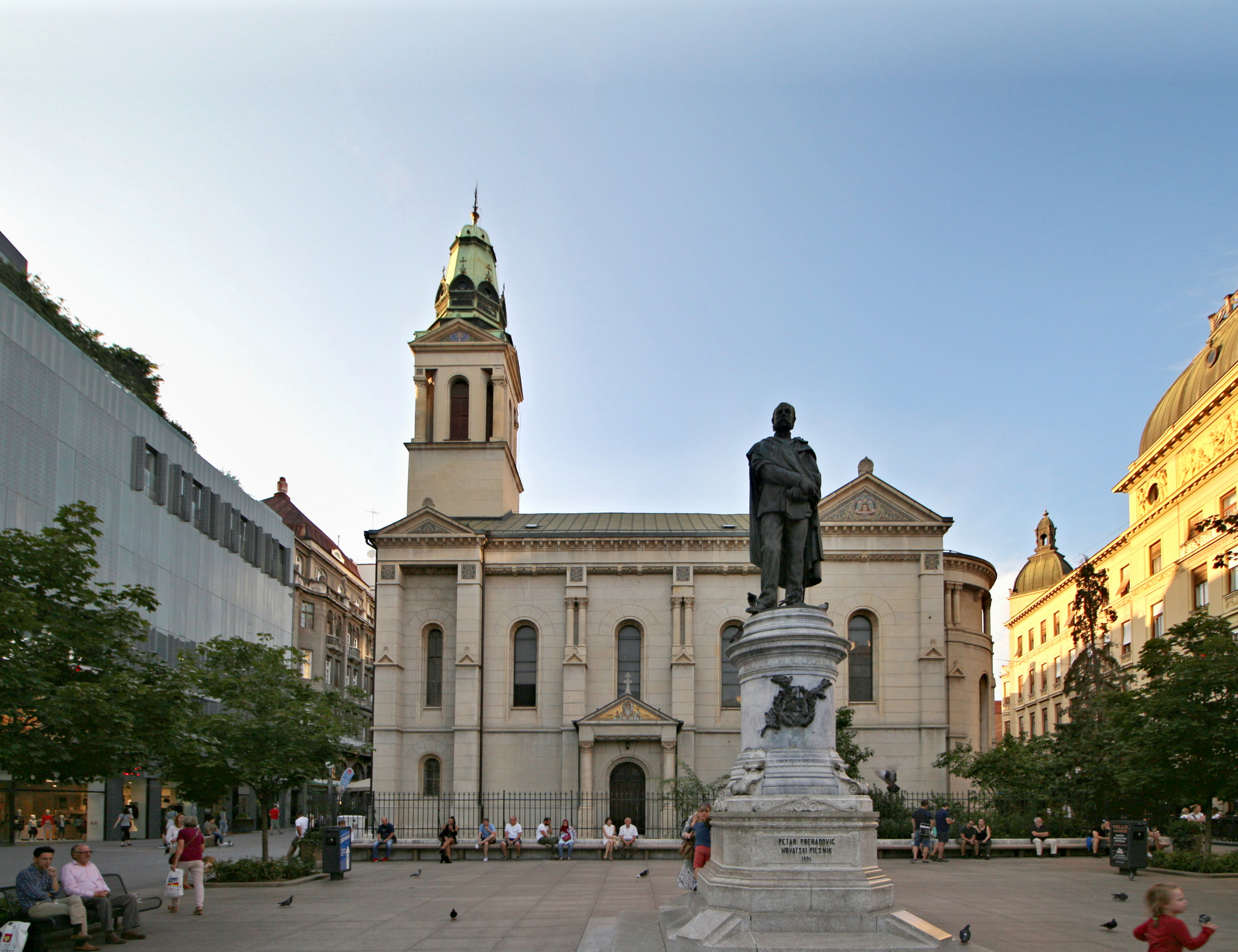
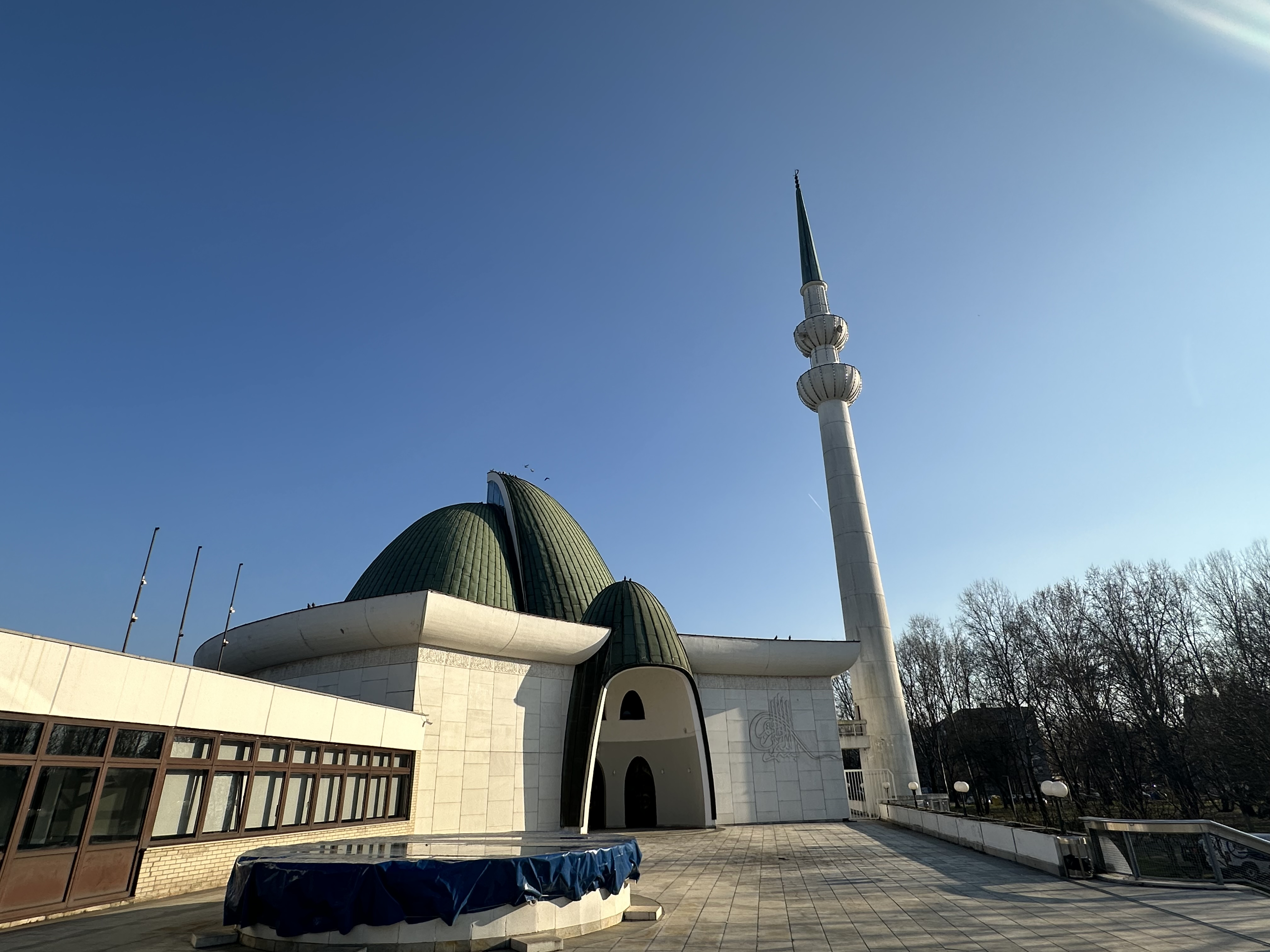
From top: Zagreb Cathedral, Synagogue of the Jewish Community of Zagreb, Serbian Orthodox Cathedral with statue of Petar Preradović and Zagreb Mosque.

The Archdiocese of Zagreb is a metropolitan see of the Catholic Church in Croatia, serving as its religious centre. The Archbishop is Dražen Kutleša. The Catholic Church is the largest religious organization in Zagreb, Catholicism being the predominant religion of Croatia, with over 1,1 million adherents. Zagreb is also the episcopal see of the Metropolitanate of Zagreb and Ljubljana of the Serbian Orthodox Church. Islamic religious organization of Croatia has the see in Zagreb. President is Mufti Aziz Hasanović. There used to be a mosque in the Meštrović Pavilion during World War II at the Square of the Victims of Fascism, but it was relocated to the neighborhood of Borovje in Peščenica. Mainstream Protestant churches have also been present in Zagreb – Evangelical Church and Reformed Christian (Calvinist) Church. The Church of Jesus Christ of Latter-day Saints is also present in the Zagreb neighborhood of Jarun whereas Jehovah's Witnesses have their headquarters in Central Zagreb. In total there are around 40 non-Catholic religious organizations and denominations in Zagreb with their headquarters and places of worship across the city making it a large and diverse multicultural community. There is also significant Jewish history through the Holocaust.

== Economy ==
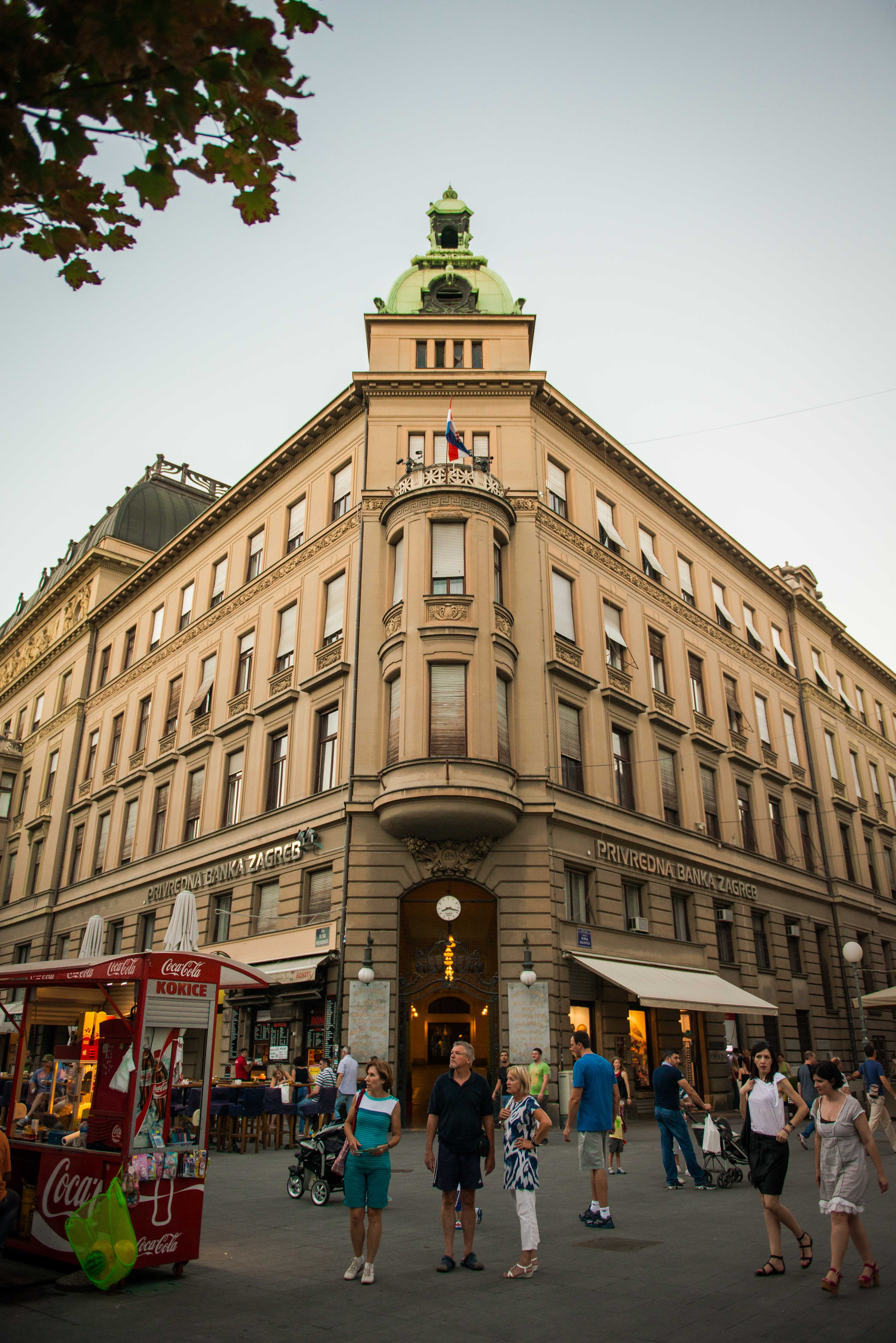
First Croatian Savings Bank

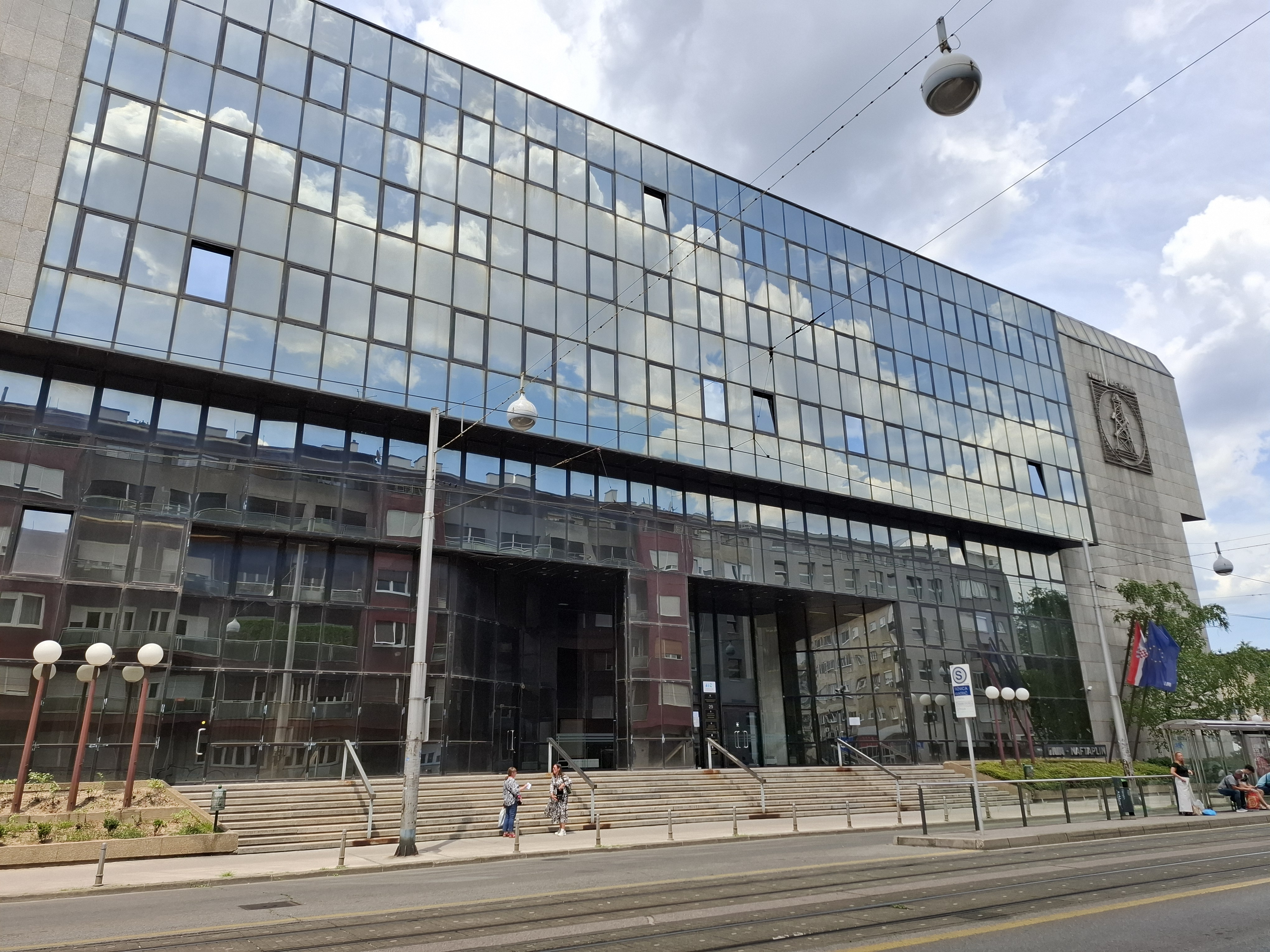
INA, Croatian multinational oil company

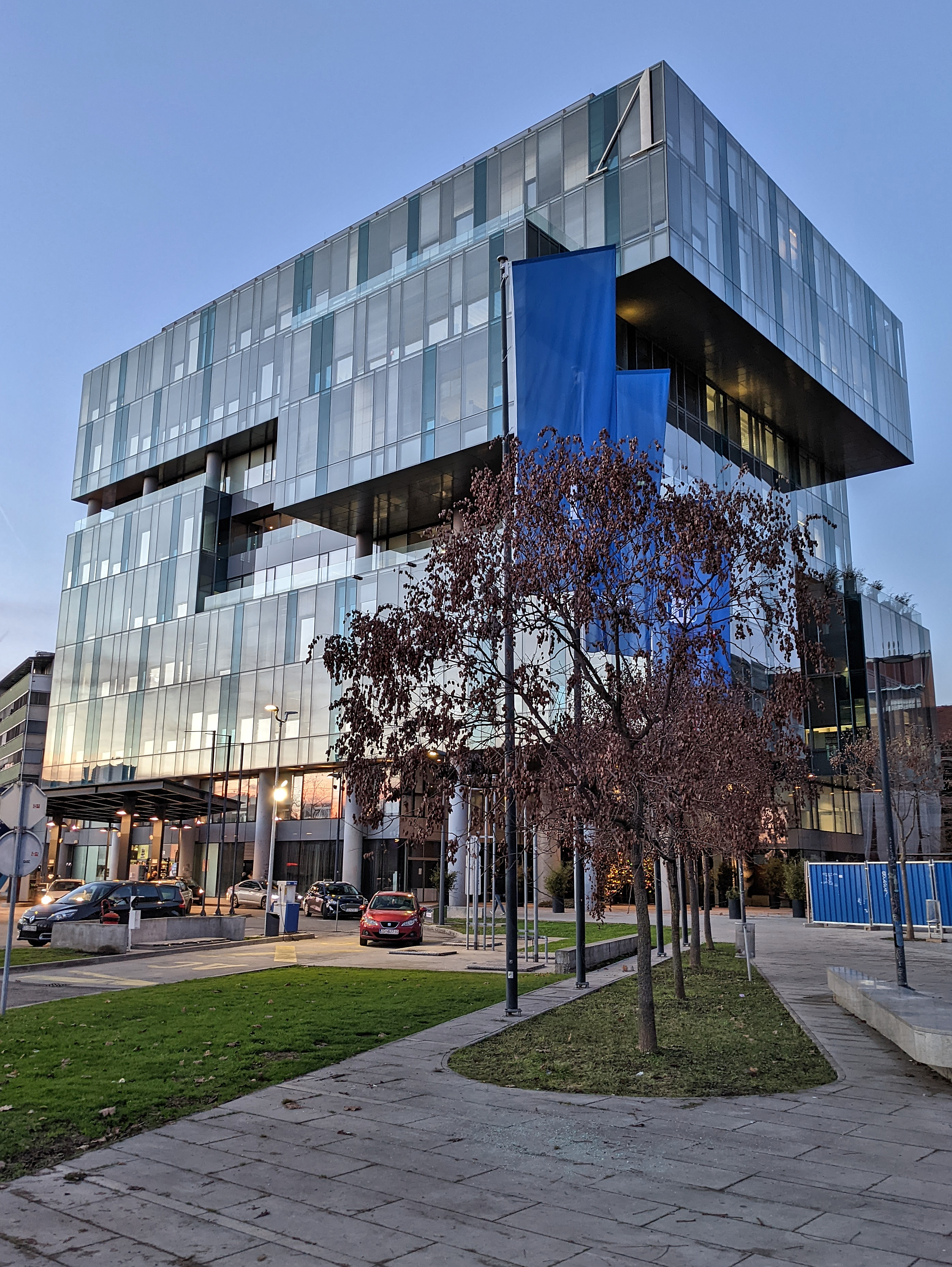
Adris Grupa

Important branches of industry are: production of electrical machines and devices, chemical, pharmaceutical, textile, food and drink processing. Zagreb is an international trade and business centre, as well as an essential transport hub placed at the crossroads of Central Europe, the Mediterranean and the Southeast Europe. Almost all of the largest Croatian as well as Central European companies and conglomerates such as Agrokor, INA, Hrvatski Telekom have their headquarters in the city.

The only Croatian stock exchange is the Zagreb Stock Exchange, which is located in Eurotower, one of the tallest Croatian skyscrapers.

According to 2008 data, the city of Zagreb has the highest PPP and nominal gross domestic product per capita in Croatia at $32,185 and $27,271 respectively, compared to the Croatian averages of US$18,686 and $15,758.

As of August 2025, the average monthly net salary in Zagreb was €1,446. The average salary in May 2015 was 6,669 kuna (about €870), which is increase of 66.2% in those 10 years. At the end of 2025, the average unemployment rate in Zagreb was around 4.6%. 34% of companies in Croatia have headquarters in Zagreb, and 38.4% of the Croatian workforce works in Zagreb, including almost all banks, utility and public transport companies.

Companies in Zagreb create 52% of the total turnover and 60% of the total profit of Croatia in 2006 as well as 35% of Croatian export and 57% of Croatian import. The following table includes some of the main economic indicators for the period 2011–2019, based on the data provided by the Croatian Bureau of Statistics. A linear interpolation was used for the population data between 2011 and 2021. While data on the yearly averaged conversion rates between HRK, EUR and USD is provided by the Croatian National Bank.

Year	Population	Exchange rate (EUR : USD)	GDP (nominal in mil. EUR)	GDP (nominal in mil. USD)	GDP per capita (nominal in EUR)	GDP per capita (nominal in USD)
2011	790,017	1.3913	15,513	21,583	19,636	27,319
2012	788,010	1.2848	15,188	19,514	19,274	24,763
2013	786,002	1.3281	15,029	19,960	19,121	25,394
2014	783,995	1.3285	15,004	19,933	19,121	25,394
2015	781,988	1.1095	15,457	17,161	19,779	21,945
2016	779,981	1.1069	16,114	17,837	20,659	22,868
2017	777,973	1.1297	17,097	19,314	21,976	24,827
2018	775,966	1.1810	18,155	21,441	23,397	27,631
2019	773,959	1.1195	19,264	21,566	24,890	27,865
2020	771,951	1.1422	17,699	20,216	22,928	26,188
2021	767,131	1.1827	20,053	23,717	26,140	30,916

== Transport ==
=== Highways ===
Zagreb bypass existing and planned routes

Zagreb is the hub of five major Croatian highways. The A6 highway was upgraded in October 2008 and leads from Zagreb to Rijeka, forming a part of the Pan-European Corridor Vb. The upgrade coincided with the opening of the bridge over the Mura river on the A4 and the completion of the Hungarian M7, which marked the opening of the first freeway corridor between Rijeka and Budapest. The A1 starts at the Lučko interchange and concurs with the A6 up to the Bosiljevo 2 interchange, connecting Zagreb and Split. A further extension of the A1 up to Dubrovnik is under construction. Both highways are tolled by the Croatian highway authorities Hrvatske autoceste and Autocesta Rijeka - Zagreb.

The A3 highway (formerly named Bratstvo i jedinstvo) was the showpiece of Croatia in the SFRY. It is the oldest Croatian highway. A3 forms a part of the Pan-European Corridor X. The highway starts at the Bregana border crossing, bypasses Zagreb forming the southern arch of the Zagreb bypass, and ends at Lipovac near the Bajakovo border crossing. It continues in Southeast Europe in the direction of Near East. This highway is tolled except for the stretch between Bobovica and Ivanja Reka interchanges.

The A2 highway is a part of the Corridor Xa. It connects Zagreb and the frequently congested Macelj border crossing, forming a near-continuous motorway-level link between Zagreb and Western Europe. Forming a part of the Corridor Vb, highway A4 starts in Zagreb forming the northeastern wing of the Zagreb bypass and leads to Hungary until the Goričan border crossing. It is often used highway around Zagreb.

The railway and the A3 highway along the Sava river that extend to Slavonia (towards Slavonski Brod, Vinkovci, Osijek and Vukovar) are some of the busiest traffic corridors in the country. The railway running along the Sutla river and the A2 highway (Zagreb-Macelj) running through Zagorje, as well as traffic connections with the Pannonian region and Hungary (the Zagorje railroad, the roads and railway to Varaždin – Čakovec and Koprivnica) are linked with truck routes. The southern railway connection to Split operates on a high-speed tilting trains line via the Lika region (renovated in 2004 to allow for a five-hour journey); a faster line along the Una river valley is in use only up to the border between Croatia and Bosnia and Herzegovina.

=== Roads ===
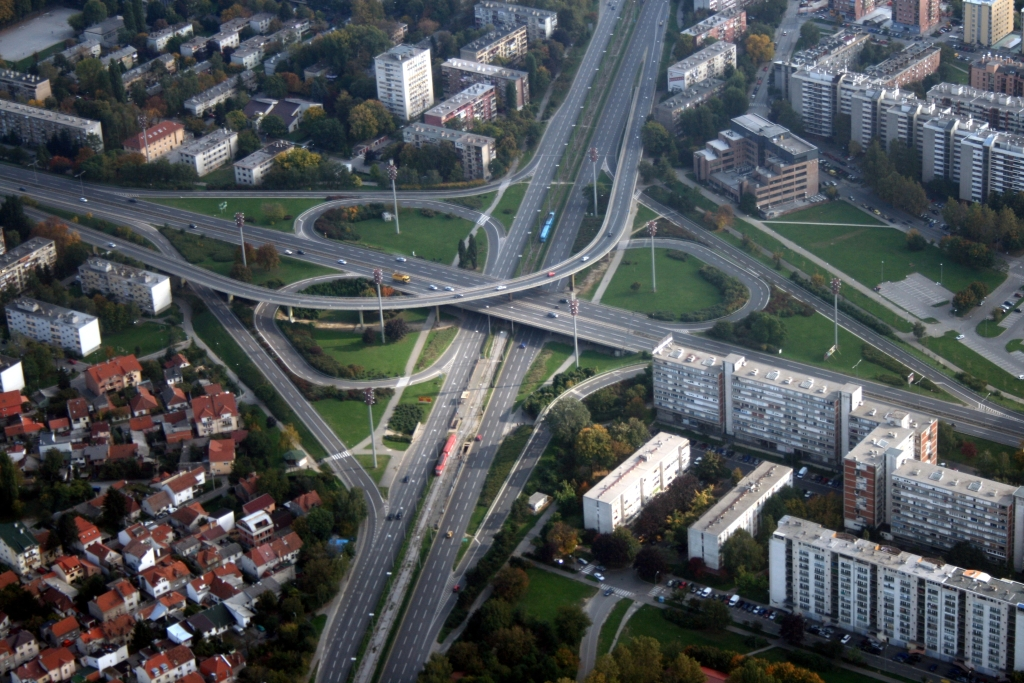
Interchange of Slavonska Avenue and Marin Držić Avenue which connects Novi Zagreb - istok with the rest of the city

The city has an extensive avenue network with numerous main arteries up to ten lanes wide. The busiest roads are the main east–west arteries, former Highway "Brotherhood and Unity", consisting of Ljubljana Avenue, Zagreb Avenue and Slavonia Avenue; and the Vukovar Avenue, the closest bypass of the city centre. The avenues were supposed to alleviate the traffic problem, but most of them are nowadays gridlocked during rush hour and others, like Branimirova Avenue and Dubrovnik Avenue which are gridlocked for the whole day. European routes E59, E65 and E70 serve Zagreb.

==== Bridges ====
The first bridge with a steel construction was built in 1892 at the end of the Sava road, replacing the previous wooden bridge. Today, Zagreb has six road traffic bridges across the river Sava, and they all span both the river and the levees, making them all by and large longer than 200 m (660 ft). In downstream order, these are:

Name	Year finished	Type	Road that goes over	Other information
Road bridges
Podsused Bridge	1982	Two-lane road bridge with a commuter train line (not yet completed)	Samoborska Road	Connects Zagreb to its close suburbs by a road to Samobor, the fastest route to Bestovje, Sveta Nedelja, and Strmec.
Jankomir Bridge	1958, 2006 (upgrade)	Four-lane road bridge	Ljubljanska Avenue	Connects Ljubljanska Avenue to the Jankomir interchange and Zagreb bypass.
Adriatic Bridge	1981	Six-lane road bridge (also carries tram tracks)	Adriatic Avenue	The most famous bridge in Zagreb. The bridge spans from Savska Street in the north to the Remetinec Roundabout in the south.
Liberty Bridge	1959	Four-lane road bridge	Većeslav Holjevac Avenue	Relieved the congested Sava Bridge. 1600 tons of steel were used to build it.
Youth Bridge	1974	Six-lane road bridge (also carries tram tracks)	Marin Držić Avenue	Connects districts Zapruđe and Trnje.
Homeland Bridge	2007	Four-lane road bridge (also carries two bicycle and two pedestrian lanes; has space reserved for tram tracks)	Radnička (Workers') Road	This bridge is the last bridge built on the Sava river to date; it links Peščenica via Radnička street to the Zagreb bypass at Kosnica. It is planned to continue towards Zagreb Airport at Pleso and Velika Gorica, and on to state road D31 going to the south.
Railway bridges
Hendrix Bridge	1939	Two-way railway bridge	–	The first bridge on that location was built in 1862 and was later replaced. It got its name after a graffiti saying "Hendrix", referring to Jimi Hendrix, kept reappearing on the bridge despite the authorities removing it.
Sava-Jakuševec Bridge	1968	Two-way railway bridge	–	Built by Đuro Đaković.
Pedestrian bridge
Sava Bridge	1938	Pedestrian bridge	Savska Road	Its first name was New Sava Bridge. It is the oldest still standing bridge over Sava, and was pedestrianized after the Adriatic Bridge was opened.

=== Cycling ===
The conditions for cycling in Zagreb are favourable because of its flat terrain under the Medvednica mountain and little snowfall during winter. Zagreb has warm summers and cold winters, which can make cycling more difficult. The biking infrastructure in the city are a series of unconnected bike lanes that start and end abruptly instead of forming a connected network. Most of the existing lanes are located on sidewalks and are indicated by a painted line. The city had a Nextbike bike-sharing system from 2013 to 2025, when it was replaced by a €11.6 million city-funded Bajs system. It is maintained by a Nextbike licensed partner Public bicycle system, since they were the only ones to make an offer.

=== Public transport ===
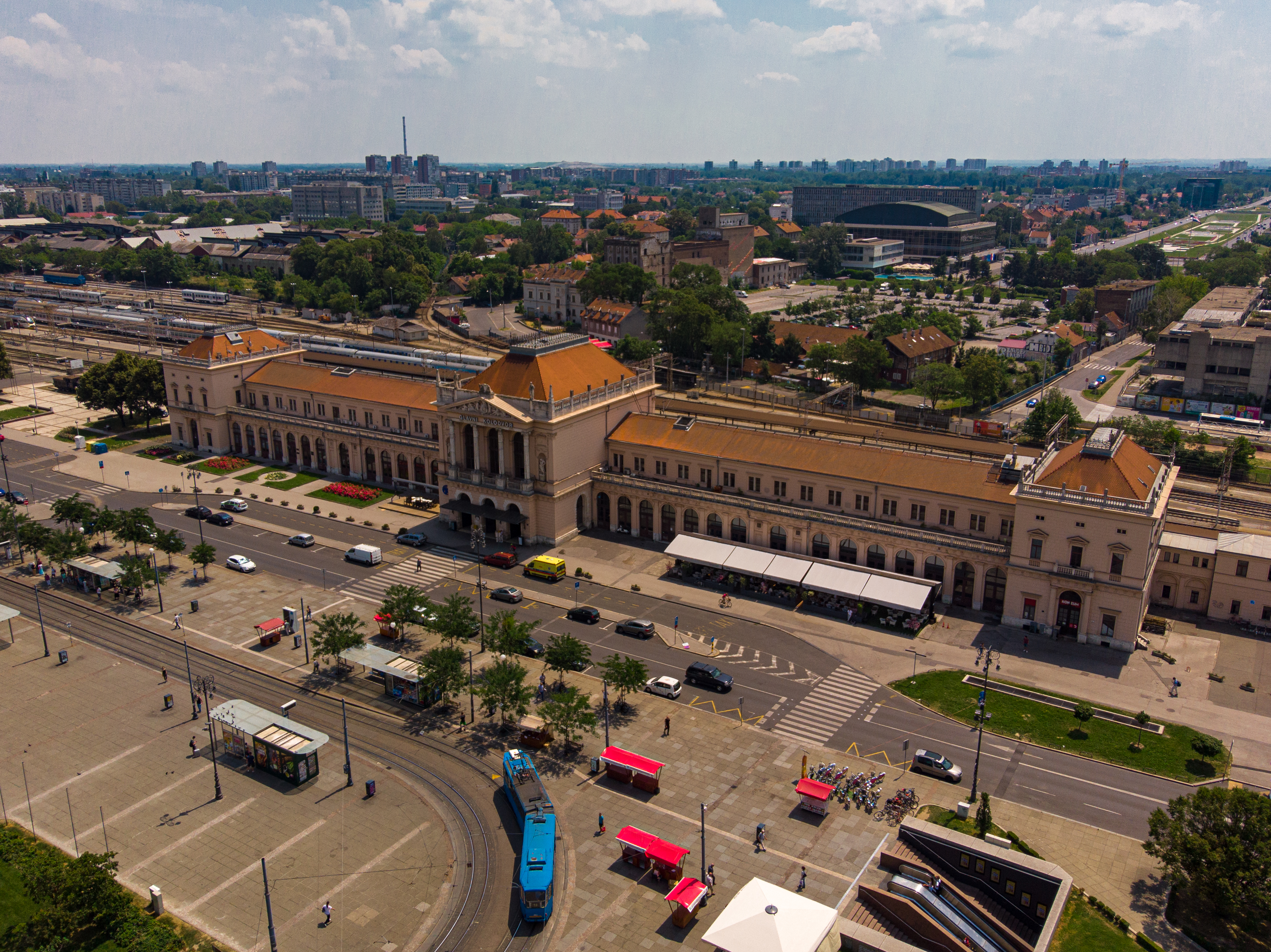
Main Railway Station

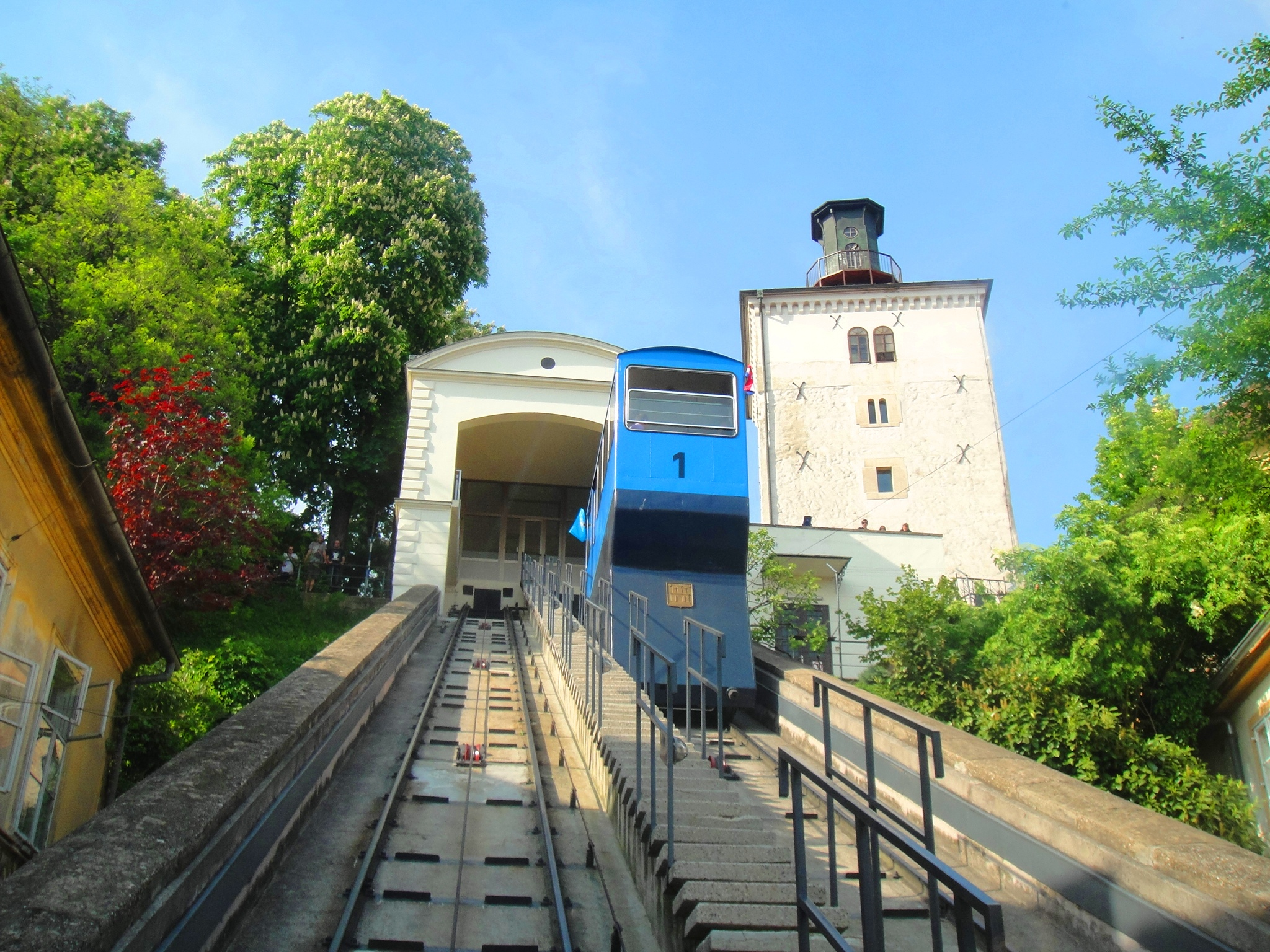
Zagreb Funicular and Lotrščak Tower

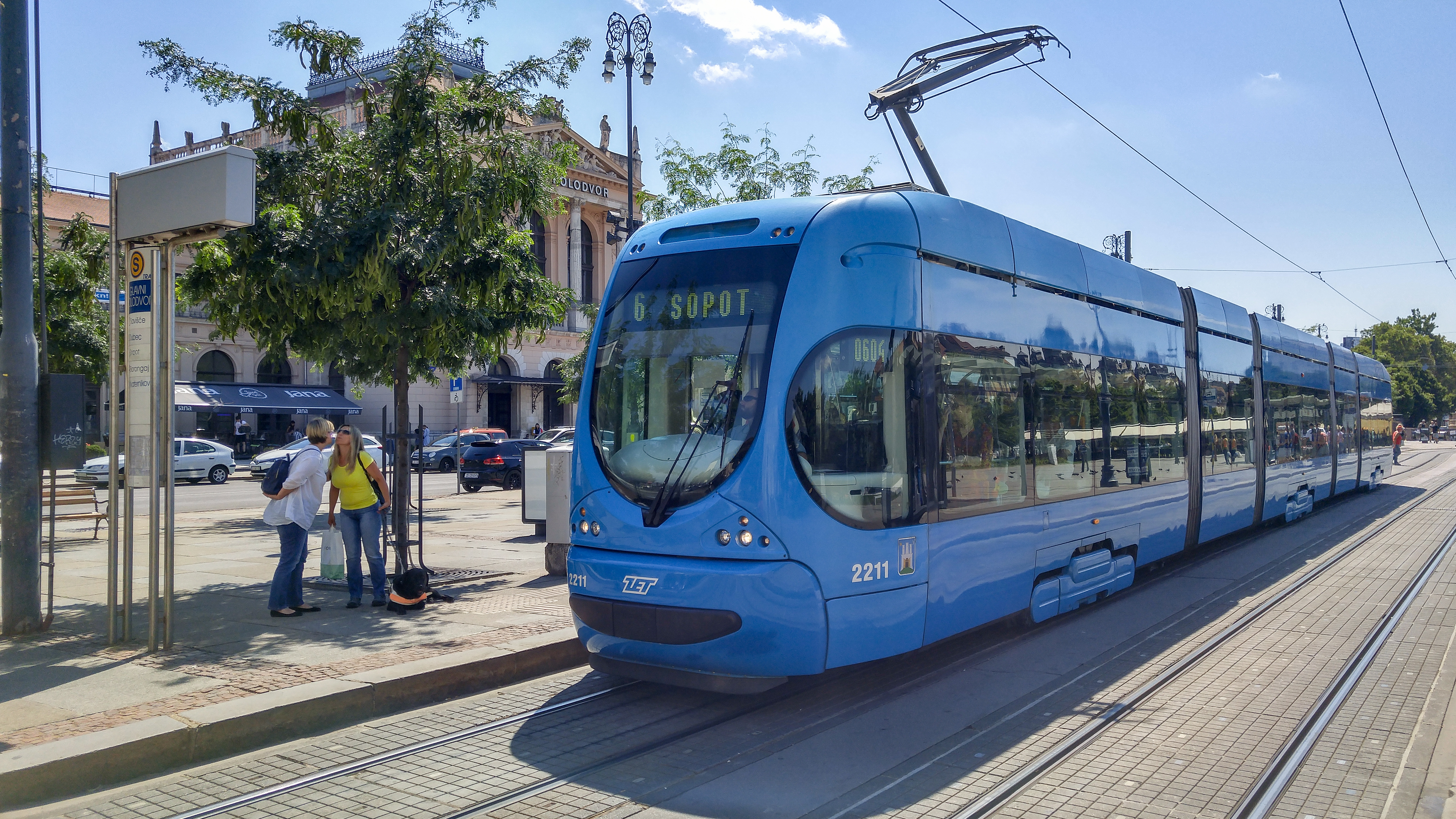
TMK 2200, the most common tram type in the fleet

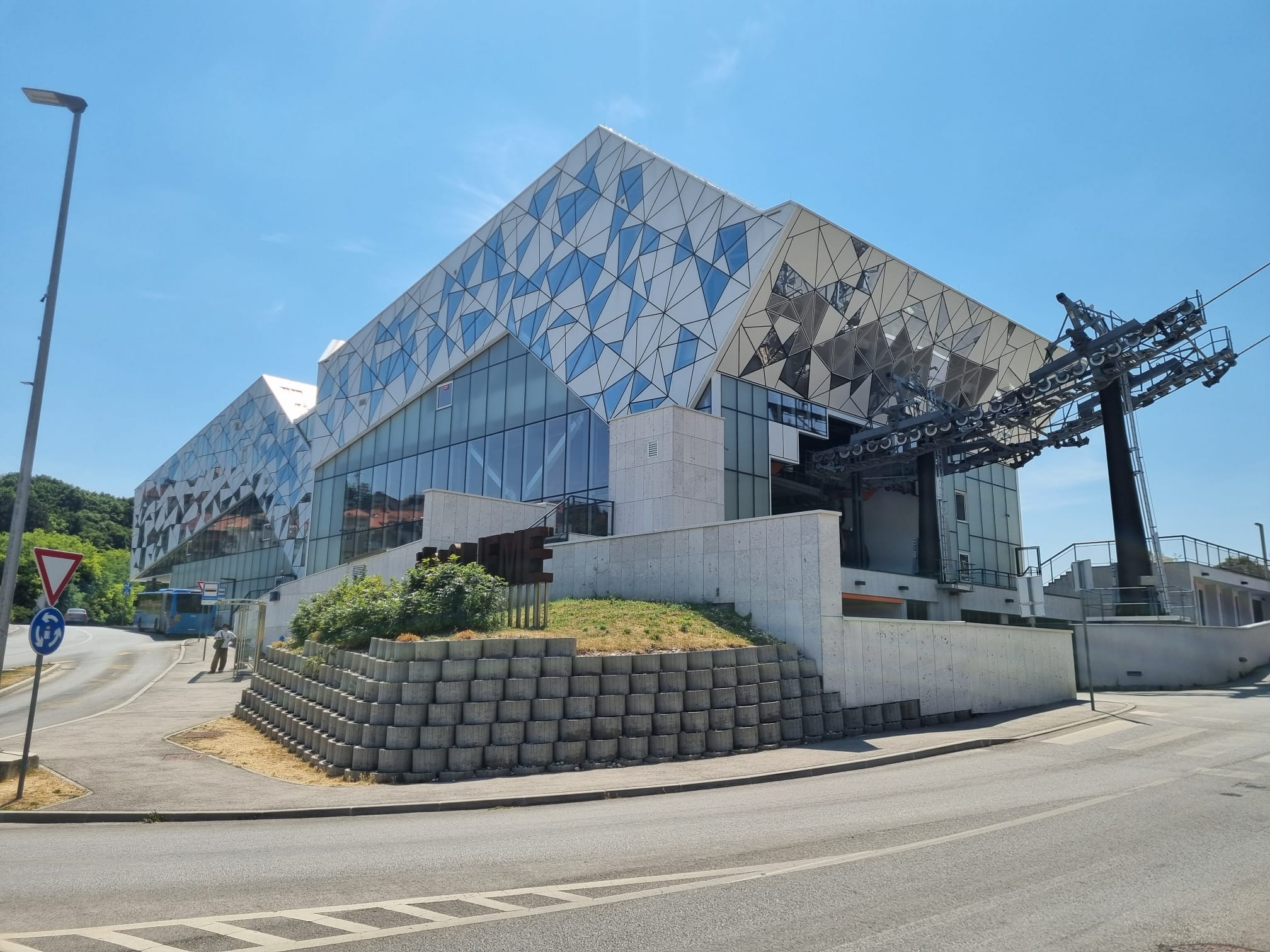
Zagreb Cable Car

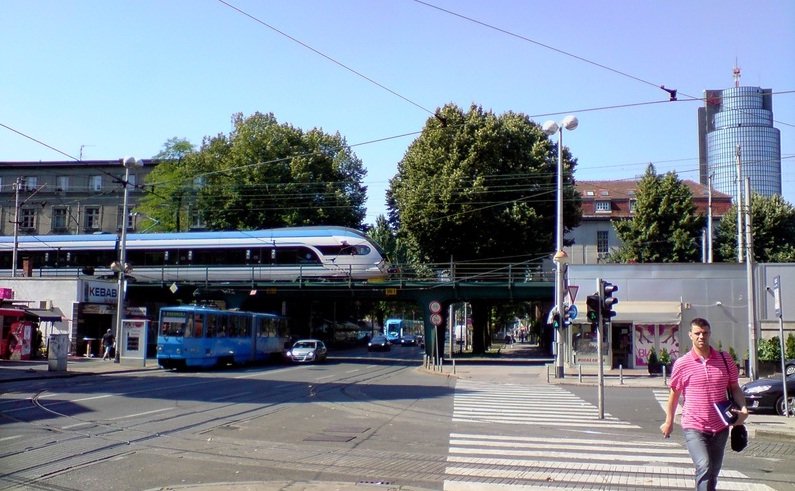
A suburban train and a tram

Public transportation in the city is organized in multiple layers: the inner parts of the city are mostly covered by trams, while the outer city areas and suburbs are linked with buses and rapid transit commuter rail. The public transportation company Zagreb Electric Tram operates all tram and city bus lines, and most of the suburban bus lines. The Zagreb Funicular (uspinjača), which was built in the 19th century and is only long 66 meters, is a popular tourist attraction. It was built before the Jubilee Economic-Forestry Exhibition to easily travel between the growing lower part of the city and the administrative and political centre on the Upper Town. To the north, Sljeme, the peak of the Medvednica mountain, is accessible by a gondola lift. The ride lasts for just over 16 minutes and has an elevation of 754 m. Zagreb Bus Station also serves as important hub for bus transport, which is very well connected with rest of the Europe.

The national rail operator Croatian Railways runs a network of urban and suburban train lines in the metropolitan Zagreb area and is a government-owned corporation.

The taxi market has been liberalized in early 2018, and numerous transport companies (including Uber) have been allowed to enter the market. Despite this liberalization, taxi prices were prevented from increasing too much via legislation that capped them on one tenth of the average monthly salary.

==== Tram network ====
Zagreb has an extensive tram network with 15 day and 4 night lines covering much of the inner- and middle-suburbs of the city. The first tram line was opened on 5 September 1891 and trams have been serving as a vital component of Zagreb mass transit ever since. Many new lines were introduced in the coming years, and by 1911, the whole network was electrified. New tracks were continuously added to the network throughout the 20th century, even during World War II under the leadership of Dragutin Mandl. The last expansion happened in 2000. The average speed of trams is only 13 km/h (8.08 mph), one of the slowest in Europe. On narrower streets, the tracks are either shared with car traffic or separated by a painted yellow line, which can still be used by taxis, buses and emergency vehicles, which can slow down trams during rush hour, whereas on larger avenues the tracks are situated inside green belts.

The rolling stock consists of the newer Croatian-built Crotram TMK 2100, TMK 2200, TMK 2300 and TMK 2400 tram types, and older Tatra T4YU and KT4YU types. The city also bought 11 used GT6M trams to replace the older TMK 201 trams. Trams transported 121.83 million people in 2024, or roughly 333,773 a day.

=== Rail ===
The train tracks form a circle around the inner-city and have branches going in four directions: Zaprešić, Dugo Selo, Jastrebarsko and Velika Gorica. Zagreb is connected with all major cities in Croatia, including Vinkovci, Karlovac, Rijeka and Split, as well with cities in other European countries - Ljubljana, Budapest, Munich, Vienna and Zurich. A 2024 Greenpeace study found out that Zagreb had much unused potential in connecting with other major European cities, instead prioritizing air travel.

==== Commuter rail ====
The commuter rail network in Zagreb has existed since 1992, with the introduction of the Savski Marof - Zagreb - Dugo Selo line. In 2005, suburban rail services were increased to a 15-minute frequency serving the middle and outer suburbs of Zagreb, primarily in the east–west direction and to the southern districts. This has enhanced the commuting opportunities across the city. The cities connected by the suburban lines include Harmica, Savski Marof, Zaprešić, Dugo Selo and Velika Gorica. The passenger trains ride on the same tracks as freight trains, which can cause delays. Zagreb Electric Tram and HŽ Putnički prijevoz offer combined monthly and yearly ticket passes with discounted prices.

=== Air traffic ===
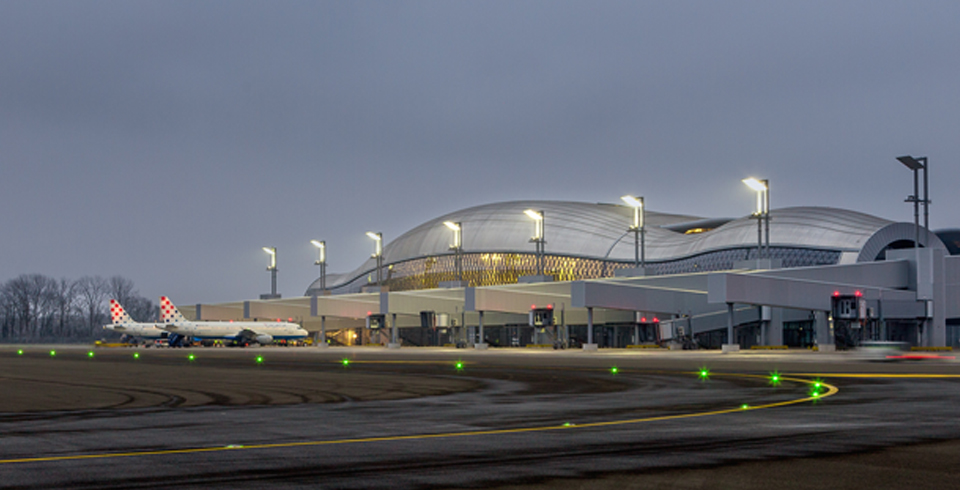
Franjo Tuđman Airport terminal

Zagreb Franjo Tuđman Airport (IATA: ZAG, ICAO: LDZA) is the main Croatian international airport, a 17 km (11 mi) drive southeast of Zagreb in the city of Velika Gorica. The airport is also the main Croatian airbase featuring a fighter squadron, helicopters, as well as military and freight transport aircraft. The airport had 3.45 million passengers in 2019 with a new passenger terminal being opened in late March 2017 that can accommodate up to 5.5 million passengers, and in 2025 it hit record number of passengers with 4.72 million, making it the busiest airport in Croatia and one of the busiest airports in Europe. Zagreb Airport is the only airport in Croatia that has direct flights with Canada, and one of two (with Dubrovnik Airport) to have direct flights with North America. The airport is served by a bus line from Eugen Kvaternik Square.

Zagreb also has a second, smaller airport, Lučko Airfield (ICAO: LDZL). It is home to sports airplanes and a Croatian special police unit, as well as being a military helicopter airbase. Lučko used to be the main airport of Zagreb from 1947 to 1959.

A third, small grass airfield, Buševec, is located just outside Velika Gorica. It is primarily used for sports purposes.

== Education ==
Zagreb has 136 primary schools and 100 secondary schools, including 30 gymnasia. There are 5 public higher education institution and 9 private professional higher education schools.

There are 4 international schools in Zagreb:

- American International School of Zagreb (AISZ)
- The Learning Tree International Kindergarten (TLT)
- French School in Zagreb
- British International School of Zagreb.

=== University of Zagreb ===
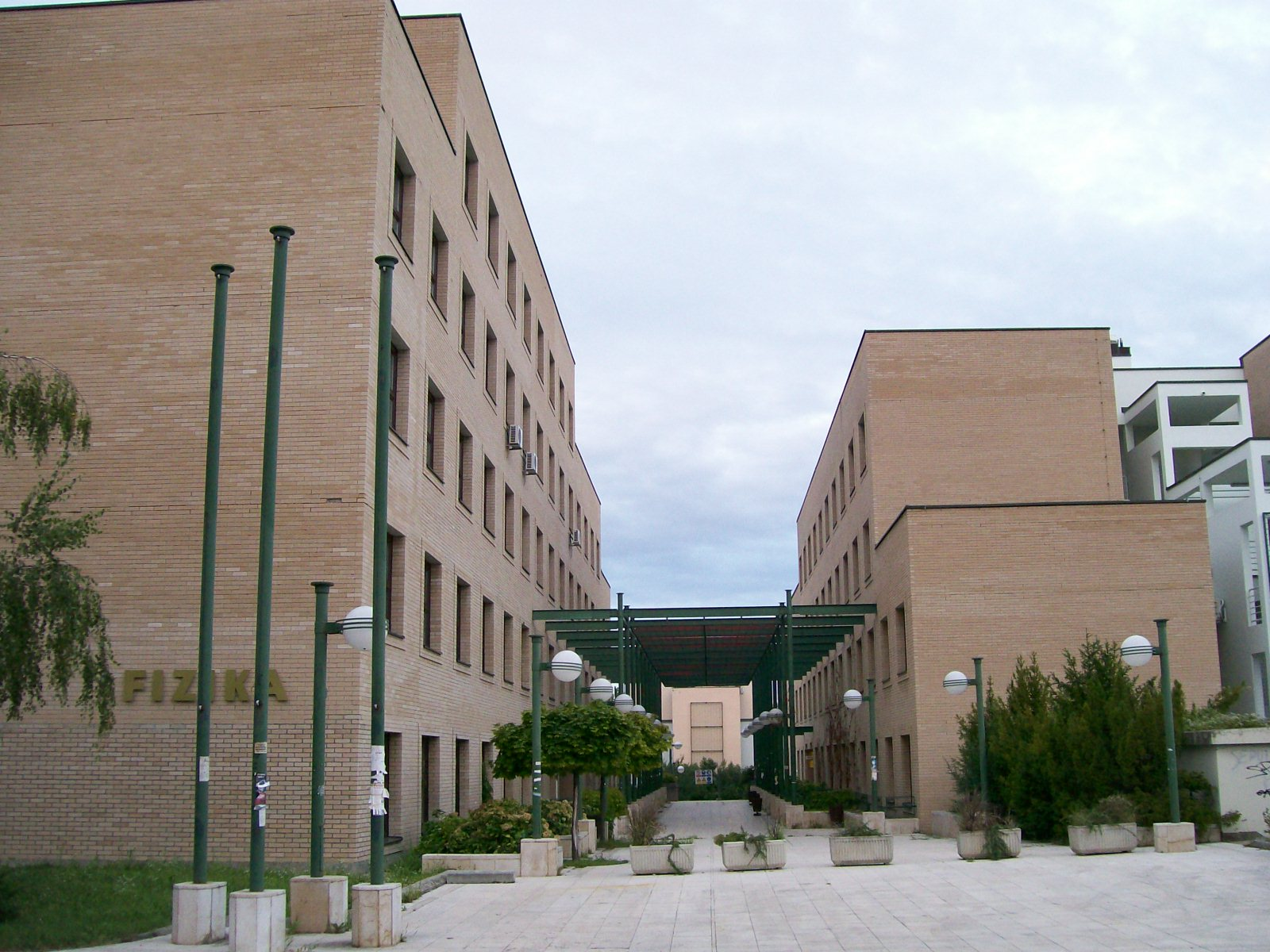
Faculty of Science, University of Zagreb

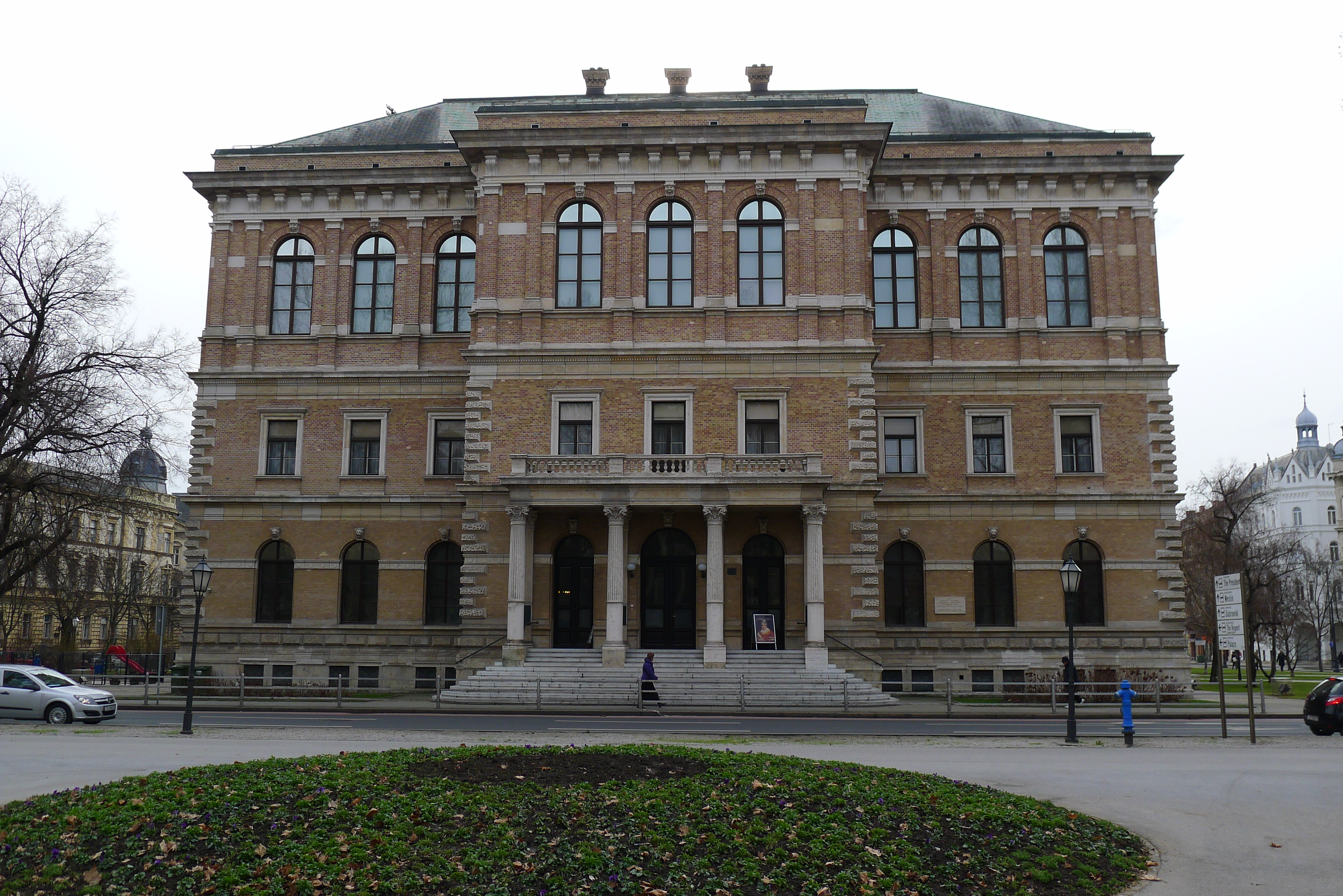
Croatian Academy of Sciences and Arts

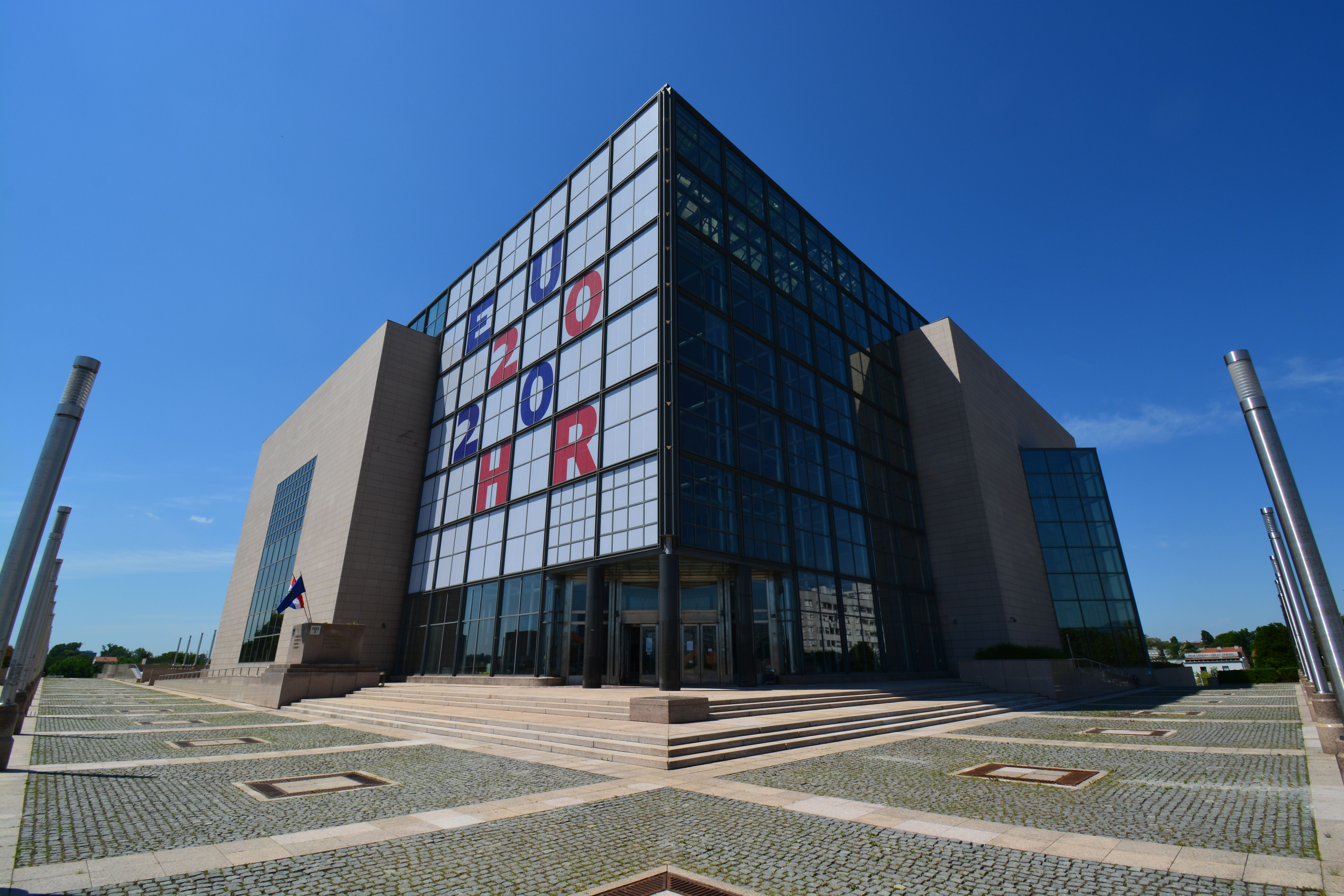
National and University Library

Founded in 1669, the University of Zagreb is the oldest continuously operating university in Croatia and one of the largest and oldest universities in the Southeastern Europe. Ever since its foundation, the university has been continually growing and developing and now consists of 29 faculties, three art academies and the Croatian Studies Centre. More than 200,000 students have attained the Bachelor's degree at the university, which has also assigned 18,000 Master's and 8,000 Doctor's degrees. As of 2011, the University of Zagreb is ranked among 500 Best Universities of the world by the Shanghai Academic Ranking of World Universities.

Zagreb is the seat of two private universities: the Catholic University of Croatia and the Libertas International University. It also hosts numerous public and private polytechnics, colleges and higher professional schools.

== Notable people ==
=== Artists ===
- Lea Deutsch (1927–1943), child actress
- Ante Garmaz (1928–2011), Argentine actor, fashion designer, television presenter and model
- Kristina Krepela (born 1979), actress
- Sanja Iveković (born 1949), photographer, performer, sculptor and installation artist
- Jagoda Kaloper (1947–2016), painter and actress
- Igor Kordej (born 1957), comic book artist
- Darko Macan (born 1966), writer and illustrator
- Ivan Meštrović (1883–1962), sculptor, architect, and writer
- Velimir Neidhardt (born 1942), architect
- Vlado Milunić (1941–2022), architect, known for designing the Dancing House in Prague
- Vera Nikolić Podrinska (1886–1972), painter and baroness
- Srećko Puntarić (born 1952), cartoonist
- Josip Račić (1885–1908), painter
- Esad Ribić (born 1972), comic book artist
- Goran Sudžuka (born 1969), comic book artist
- Marino Tartaglia (1894–1984), painter
- Vladimir Varlaj (1895–1962), artist
- Zdravko Zupan (1950–2015), comic book creator and historian

=== Footballers ===
- Milan Badelj (born 1989), football player
- Josip Brekalo (born 1998), football player
- Marcelo Brozović (born 1992), football player
- Tomislav Butina (born 1974), football player
- Ivan Čunčić (born 1985), football player
- Joško Gvardiol (born 2002), football player
- Tin Jedvaj (born 1995), football player
- Josip Juranović (born 1995), football player
- Andrej Kramarić (born 1991), football player
- Niko Kranjčar (born 1984), football player
- Jerko Leko (born 1980), football player
- Lovro Majer (born 1998), football player
- Jasmin Mujdža (born 1974), football player
- Mensur Mujdža (born 1984), football player
- Mislav Oršić (born 1992), football player
- Dubravko Pavličić (1967–2012), football player
- Josip Pivarić (born 1989), football player
- Marko Pjaca (born 1995), football player
- Dario Šimić (born 1975), football player
- Zvonimir Soldo (born 1967), football player
- Bernard Vukas (1927–1983), football player

=== Other sportspeople ===
- Vasilije Calasan (born 1981), French racing driver
- Marin Čolak (born 1984), racing driver
- Borna Ćorić (born 1996), tennis player
- Krešimir Ćosić (1948–1995), basketball player
- Danko Cvjetićanin (born 1963), basketball player
- Josip Glasnović (born 1983), sports shooter, Olympic gold medal winner
- Zlatko Horvat (born 1984), handball player
- Filip Hrgović (born 1992), professional boxer
- Ivo Karlović (born 1979), tennis player
- Nenad Kljaić (born 1966), handball player
- Vjekoslav Kobešćak (born 1974), water polo player and coach
- Ivica Kostelić (born 1979), alpine ski racer
- Janica Kostelić (born 1982), alpine ski racer, four-time Olympic gold medalist
- Luka Lončar (born 1987), water polo player
- Iva Majoli (born 1977), tennis player
- Petra Marčinko (born 2005), tennis player
- Nikola Mektić (born 1988), tennis player, Olympic gold medal winner
- Nika Mühl (born 2001), basketball player
- Mirko Novosel (born 1938), basketball player
- Tomislav Paškvalin (born 1961), water polo player
- Sandra Elkasević (born 1990), discus thrower, won two gold medals at the Summer Olympics
- Dubravko Šimenc (born 1966), water polo player
- Martin Sinković (born 1989), rower, Olympic gold medal winner
- Valent Sinković (born 1988), rower, Olympic gold medal winner
- Tin Srbić (born 1996), artistic gymnast
- Manuel Štrlek (born 1988), handball player
- Igor Vori (born 1980), handball player
- Vedran Zrnić (born 1979), handball player

=== Military ===
- Haim Bar-Lev (1924–1994), Israeli general and politician

=== Music ===
- Zlatko Baloković (1895–1965), violinist
- Jarmila Gerbič (1877–1964), Slovenian soprano, opera singer, concert vocalist and music teacher
- Josipa Lisac (born 1950), Croatian singer
- Tajči (born 1970), Croatian singer, television show host
- Miljenko Matijević (born 1964), singer-songwriter; the lead vocalist of rock band Steelheart
- Zinka Milanov (1906–1989), operatic spinto soprano
- Nina Badrić (born 1972), pop singer-songwriter
- Lana Jurčević (born 1984), pop singer
- Antonija Šola (born 1979), musician, singer-songwriter, lyricist, actress and music producer
- Sanja Doležal (born 1963), pop singer and television host, member of the pop music band Novi fosili
- Ana Rucner (born 1983), Croatian cellist
- Aleksandar Marton (born 1959), Singer-songwriter

=== Religion ===
- Mihalj Šilobod Bolšić (1724–1787), Roman Catholic priest, mathematician, writer, and musical theorist primarily known for writing the first Croatian arithmetic textbook Arithmatika Horvatzka (published in Zagreb, 1758)
- Miroslav Šalom Freiberger (1903–1943), chief rabbi and writer
- Josip Juraj Strossmayer (1815–1905), politician, Roman Catholic bishop, and benefactor

=== Science and humanities ===
- Marin Soljačić (born 1974), Croatian-American physicist
- Ivan Đikić (born 1966), molecular biologist, director of the Institute of Biochemistry II at Goethe University Frankfurt
- Mario Jurić (born 1979), astronomer
- Vesna Girardi-Jurkić (1944–2012), archaeologist and museologist
- Dragutin Gorjanović-Kramberger (1856–1936), geologist, palaeontologist, and archaeologist
- Milan Kangrga (1923–2008), philosopher
- Radoslav Katičić (1930–2019), linguist, classical philologist
- Nada Klaić (1920–1988), historian
- Ivo Kolin (1924–2007), inventor
- Marko Turina (1937-2026), cardiac surgeon
- Zdravko Lorković (1900–1998), biologist, entomologist and geneticist
- Ranko Matasović (born 1968), linguist
- Ivo Pilar (1874–1933), historian, politician, publicist and lawyer
- Martin Previšić (born 1984), historian
- Vesna Pusić (born 1953), sociologist and politician
- Marin Soljačić (born 1974), physicist and electrical engineer
- Rudi Supek (1913–1993), sociologist and philosopher
- Goran Švob (1947–2013), philosopher and logician
- Josip Torbar (1824–1900), natural scientist
- Hrvoje Turković (born 1943), film theorist
- Ljudevit Vukotinović (1813–1893), politician, writer and naturalist
- Milena Žic-Fuchs (born 1954), linguist

=== Writers ===
- Tituš Brezovački (1757–1805), playwright, satirist and poet
- August Cesarec (1893–1941), writer
- Bora Ćosić (born 1932), writer
- Dimitrija Demeter (1811–1872), writer
- Daša Drndić (1946–2018), writer
- Zoran Ferić (born 1961), writer
- Branko Gavella (1885–1962), theatre director and essayist
- Miroslav Krleža (1893–1981), writer, considered the greatest Croatian writer of the 20th century
- Antun Mihanović (1796–1861), poet and lyricist, wrote the national anthem of Croatia
- August Šenoa (1838–1881), novelist
- Sunčana Škrinjarić (1931–2004), writer, poet and journalist
- Davor Slamnig (born 1956), writer and musician
- Slobodan Šnajder (born 1948), writer and publicist

== See also ==
- Museum of Illusions
- Zagreb funicular
- Ilica (typeface)
- Zagreb metropolitan area

== Notes ==
Preceded by Rotterdam, Netherlands (1953)	World Gymnaestrada host city 1957	Succeeded by Stuttgart, West Germany (1961)
Preceded by Kobe, Japan (1985)	Universiade host city 1987	Succeeded by Duisburg, West Germany (1989)
