= Trešnjevka =

Neighborhood of Zagreb, Croatia

Coordinates: 45.79404°N 15.944164°E

Trešnjevka is a neighborhood of Zagreb, Croatia. Forming one of the city's inner neighborhoods, it is located in the city's southwestern area. At approximately 15.67 km^{2} in area and a population of slightly over 121,000, it is one of the most densely populated areas of the country.

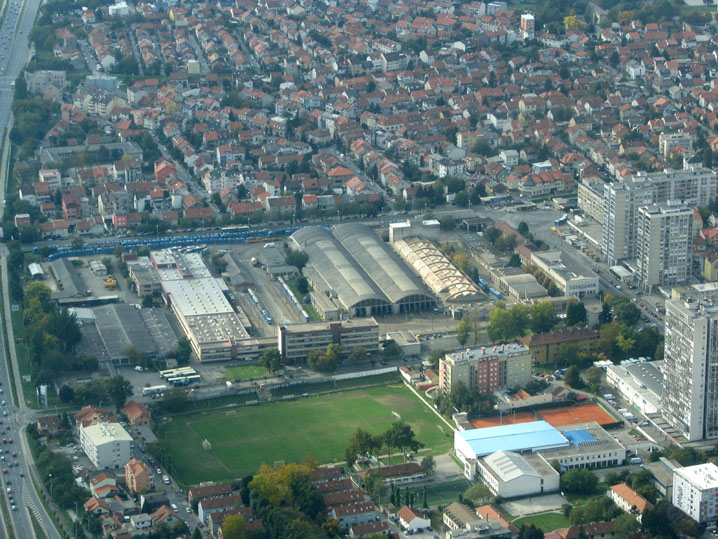
Aerial view of the Zagreb tram depot at Ljubljanica, Trešnjevka

It is administratively divided into two districts:

- Trešnjevka - sjever (Trešnjevka - north)
  - Including the neighbourhoods (mjesni odbori) of: Stara Trešnjevka, Ljubljanica, Rudeš, Voltino, Pongračevo etc.
- Trešnjevka - jug (Trešnjevka - south)
  - Including the neighbourhoods (mjesni odbori) of: Knežija, Horvati, Srednjaci, Jarun, Staglišće, Gredice, Vrbani, Rudeš etc.
