= Trešnjevka – jug =

City district of Zagreb, Croatia

Coordinates: 45°47′33.19″N 15°54′22.00″E

- District of Zagreb
- Trešnjevka - jug as a part of Zagreb
- Country: Croatia
- County/City: Zagreb

Government
  - Council President: Tihana Soljankić (M!-SDP)
  - District Council: Composition (19): M!-SDP (12); HDZ-DP-HSU-HSS (3); Marija Selak Raspudić list (3); Only Croatia-DOMiNO-HS-Blok (1)

Area
  - Total: 9.836 km^{2} (3.798 sq mi)

Population (2021)
  - Total: 65,324
  - Density: 6,641/km^{2} (17,200/sq mi)

Map

Trešnjevka – jug (pronounced [trêʃɲeːʋka jûg], lit. 'Trešnjevka – south') is a district of Zagreb, Croatia. It is in the western part of the city and has 66,674 inhabitants (2011 census).

The district encompasses the southern (Croatian: jug) part of the traditional Trešnjevka neighbourhood, separated from the northern part (Croatian: sjever) by the Zagrebačka Avenue.

== List of neighborhoods in Trešnjevka – jug ==
- Horvati
- Gajevo
- Jarun
- Knežija
- Prečko
- Srednjaci
- Staglišće
- Vrbani
- Gredice
