= ŠRC Jarun =

Multi-purpose sports venue in Zagreb, Croatia

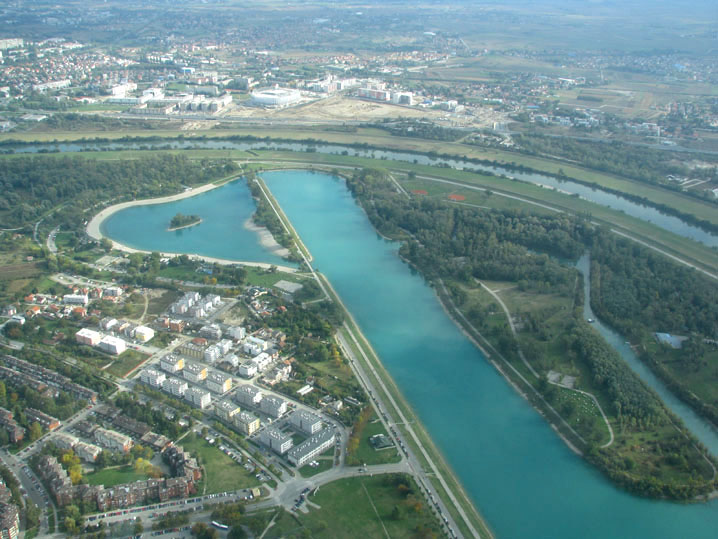
Jarun lake

Športsko-rekreacijski centar Jarun ('Sports-recreational centre Jarun'), better known by abbreviation ŠRC Jarun (also known as Rekreacijsko-sportski centar Jarun, abbr. RSC Jarun), is a multi-purpose sports venue in the Jarun neighbourhood of Zagreb owned by the City of Zagreb, which spans on 240 hectares and includes all sports and recreational facilities in and around Jarun Lake, bordered to the south by the Sava River, and on the other sides by Staglišće, Vrbani and Prečko neighbourhoods. It includes a regatta course for rowing, kayaking and canoeing, Veliko jezero ('Big Lake') and Malo jezero ('Small Lake', sailing practice grounds), bicycle and hiking trails, playgrounds for various sports (basketball, beach volleyball, beach handball, table tennis, football, bocce).

It was developed for the 1987 Summer Universiade Jarun is declared a bathing resort a year later. Five pebble beaches can accommodate up to 20,000 swimmers in the summer months.

The World Rowing Cup race is held on the regatta course.

The Croatian Army and Croatian Mountain Rescue Service on the occasion of Croatian Army Day and Statehood Day regularly hold a commemorative program, exhibitions of weapons and military equipment, demonstration exercises, etc.
