= Vugrovec =

Village suburb of Zagreb, Croatia

- Village
- Location within Croatia
- Coordinates: 45°52′52″N 16°06′32″E
- Country: Croatia
- County: City of Zagreb

Area
  - Total: 0.85 sq mi (2.2 km^{2})
- Elevation: 548 ft (167 m)

Population (2021)
  - Total: 920
  - Density: 1,100/sq mi (420/km^{2})
- Time zone: UTC+1 (CET)
  - Summer (DST): UTC+2 (CEST)

Vugrovec is a village in Croatia. It is formally a settlement (naselje) of Zagreb, the capital of Croatia. For the 1991 Croatian census, the village was divided into Vugrovec Gornji and Vugrovec Donji. For the 2021 Croatian census, Vugrovec Donji, Kućanec, and Vuger Selo have been merged into a new settlement named Vugrovec, while Vugrovec Gornji remains as a separate settlement.

Vugrovec is located about 10 kilometres (6.2 mi) northeast of Zagreb city centre, and north of Sesvete. Vugrovec lent its name to the Vuger stream, whose source lies nearby.

== Demographics ==
According to the 2021 census, its population was 920.
