= Vugrovec Donji =

- Village
- Location within Croatia
- Coordinates: 45°52′52″N 16°06′32″E
- Country: Croatia
- County: City of Zagreb
- City District: Sesvete

Area
  - Total: 0.85 sq mi (2.2 km^{2})
- Elevation: 548 ft (167 m)

Population (2021)
  - Total: 920
  - Density: 1,100/sq mi (420/km^{2})
- Time zone: UTC+1 (CET)
  - Summer (DST): UTC+2 (CEST)

Vugrovec Donji is a village in Croatia. It was formerly a settlement (naselje) of Zagreb, the capital of Croatia, since the division of Vugrovec into Vugrovec Gornji and Vugrovec Donji in 1991. For the 2021 Croatian census, it has been merged with Kućanec and Vuger Selo into a new settlement named Vugrovec.

== Demographics ==
According to the 2011 census, it had 442 inhabitants.
