= Wisconsin Engineering =

Wisconsin Engineering (officially Wisconsin Engineering CZ s.r.o) is a US-Czech manufacturer of utility tractors, compact tractors, and outdoor power equipment for the premium consumer, light commercial, and professional markets. Legally, the company is structured as a "společnost s ručením omezeným" which is the Czech equivalent of a limited liability company (llc) in the United States.

Wisconsin Engineering was founded in 1992 in Sheboygan, Wisconsin in the US, by Dr. Jerry J. Olmr, Ph.D., as a mechanical design consultancy and production tooling brokerage. Several pioneering lawn tractor designs were introduced during the first years, including a commercial grade rear bagging lawn tractor that has become the company's best selling and most widely distributed product.

During the mid-1990s, prototypes of this machine, as well as several others, were shown in major outdoor power equipment shows across the world, with the most viable interest coming from the European market. Manufacturing facilities in Prostejov, Czech Republic were first leased in 1996, later purchased in 1998, from the then defunct Agrostroj Prostejov (later Wikov-Slavia).

Wisconsin Engineering has had partnerships with the following organizations:

- Agrostroj
- Agrozet
- Ariens
- Belovar
- MTD
- Slavia Napejdel
- Zahow
- Zetor

In addition to supplying finished tractor and power equipment products, Wisconsin Engineering derives a significant portion of its revenue from contract manufacturing operations. As of 2010, Wisconsin Engineering employs over 220 employees and is ISO 2001:2009 certified. It remains entirely privately held.

Wisconsin Engineering is not related to Wiscon, Wis-Con, Teledyne, or Continental.

== Sources ==
- http://wisconsin-engineering-cz.czechtrade.us/
- http://www.traktorsider.com/default-css.asp?k=1922&id=8145
