= Jesenovec =

- Village
- Location within Croatia
- Coordinates: 45°55′08″N 16°08′40″E
- Country: Croatia
- County: City of Zagreb
- City District: Sesvete

Area
  - Total: 1.0 sq mi (2.7 km^{2})
- Elevation: 417 ft (127 m)

Population (2021)
  - Total: 398
  - Density: 380/sq mi (150/km^{2})
- Time zone: UTC+1 (CET)
  - Summer (DST): UTC+2 (CEST)

Jesenovec is a village in Croatia. It is formally a settlement (naselje) of Zagreb, the capital of Croatia.

== Demographics ==
According to the 2021 census, its population was 398. According to the 2011 census, it had 460 inhabitants.
