= Dobrodol, Croatia =

Dobrodol
- Village
- Location within Croatia
- Coordinates: 45°51′39″N 16°05′48″E
- Country: Croatia
- County: City of Zagreb
- City District: Sesvete

Area
  - Total: 1.7 sq mi (4.3 km^{2})
- Elevation: 627 ft (191 m)

Population (2021)
  - Total: 1,165
  - Density: 700/sq mi (270/km^{2})
- Time zone: UTC+1 (CET)
  - Summer (DST): UTC+2 (CEST)

Dobrodol is a village in Croatia. It is formally a settlement (naselje) of Zagreb, the capital of Croatia.

== Demographics ==
According to the 2021 census, its population was 1,165. According to the 2011 census, it had 1,203 inhabitants.
