= Žerjavinec =

- Village
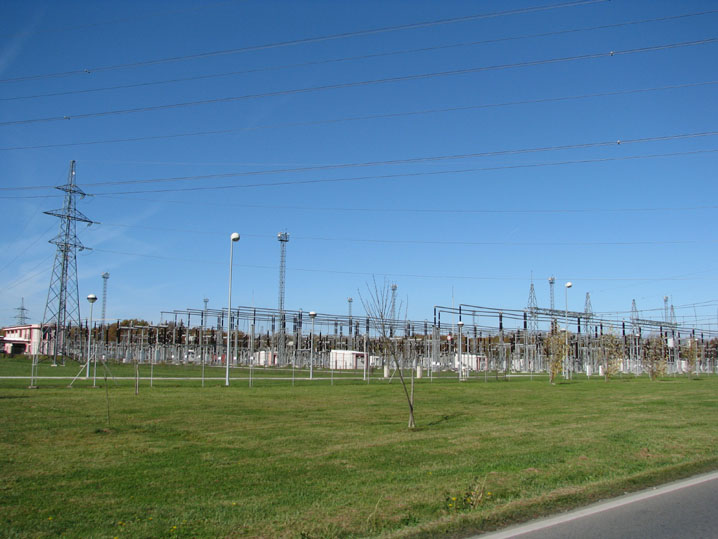
- Žerjavinec Substation

- Location within Croatia
- Coordinates: 45°52′N 16°10′E
- Country: Croatia
- County: City of Zagreb
- City District: Sesvete

Area
  - Total: 0.93 sq mi (2.4 km^{2})

Population (2021)
  - Total: 526
  - Density: 570/sq mi (220/km^{2})
- Time zone: UTC+1 (CET)
  - Summer (DST): UTC+2 (CEST)

Žerjavinec is a village in Croatia. It is connected by the D3 highway. It is formally a settlement (naselje) of Zagreb, the capital of Croatia.

== Demographics ==
According to the 2021 census, its population was 526.
