= Glavnica Donja =

- Village
- Location within Croatia
- Coordinates: 45°56′26″N 16°08′35″E
- Country: Croatia
- County: City of Zagreb
- City District: Sesvete

Area
  - Total: 2.6 sq mi (6.8 km^{2})
- Elevation: 690 ft (210 m)

Population (2021)
  - Total: 506
  - Density: 190/sq mi (74/km^{2})
- Time zone: UTC+1 (CET)
  - Summer (DST): UTC+2 (CEST)

Glavnica Donja is a village in Croatia. It is formally a settlement (naselje) of Zagreb, the capital of Croatia.

== Demographics ==
According to the 2021 census, its population was 506. According to the 2011 census, it had 544 inhabitants.
