= Prekvršje =

- Village
- Location within Croatia
- Coordinates: 45°53′51″N 16°06′36″E
- Country: Croatia
- County: City of Zagreb
- City District: Sesvete

Area
  - Total: 0.97 sq mi (2.5 km^{2})
- Elevation: 597 ft (182 m)

Population (2021)
  - Total: 874
  - Density: 910/sq mi (350/km^{2})
- Time zone: UTC+1 (CET)
  - Summer (DST): UTC+2 (CEST)

Prekvršje is a village in Croatia. It is formally a settlement (naselje) of Zagreb, the capital of Croatia.

== Demographics ==
According to the 2021 census, its population was 874. According to the 2011 census, it had 809 inhabitants.
