= Vrbani =

Vrbani may refer to:

- Vrbani, Zagreb, a neighbourhood of western Zagreb
- Vrbani, Istria County, a village near Vižinada
