= Kašinska Sopnica =

- Village
- Location within Croatia
- Coordinates: 45°54′46″N 16°07′11″E
- Country: Croatia
- County: City of Zagreb
- City District: Sesvete

Area
  - Total: 0.81 sq mi (2.1 km^{2})
- Elevation: 794 ft (242 m)

Population (2021)
  - Total: 187
  - Density: 230/sq mi (89/km^{2})
- Time zone: UTC+1 (CET)
  - Summer (DST): UTC+2 (CEST)

Kašinska Sopnica is a village in Croatia. It is formally a settlement (naselje) of Zagreb, the capital of Croatia.

== Demographics ==
According to the 2021 census, its population was 187. According to the 2011 census, it had 245 inhabitants.
