= Kupinečki Kraljevec =

- Village
- Location within Croatia
- Coordinates: 45.683°N 15.85°E
- Country: Croatia
- County: City of Zagreb
- City District: Brezovica

Area
  - Total: 10.0 sq mi (26.0 km^{2})

Population (2021)
  - Total: 2,015
  - Density: 201/sq mi (77.5/km^{2})
- Time zone: UTC+1 (CET)
  - Summer (DST): UTC+2 (CEST)

Kupinečki Kraljevec is a village in Central Croatia, located south of Zagreb. It is formally a settlement (naselje) of Zagreb, the capital of Croatia.

== Demographics ==
According to the 2021 census, its population was 2,015. According to the 2011 census, it had 1,957 inhabitants.
