= Zadvorsko =

- Village
- Location within Croatia
- Coordinates: 45°43′11″N 15°54′33″E
- Country: Croatia
- County: City of Zagreb
- City District: Brezovica

Area
  - Total: 0.81 sq mi (2.1 km^{2})
- Elevation: 387 ft (118 m)

Population (2021)
  - Total: 1,260
  - Density: 1,600/sq mi (600/km^{2})
- Time zone: UTC+1 (CET)
  - Summer (DST): UTC+2 (CEST)

Zadvorsko is a village in Croatia. It's a city near Zagreb, the capital of Croatia.

== Demographics ==
According to the 2021 census, its population was 1,590. According to the 2011 census, it had 1,288 inhabitants.
