= Church of Mary Help of Christians, Zagreb =

Church of Mary Help of Christians (Croatian: Župna crkva Blažene Djevice Marije Pomoćnice)
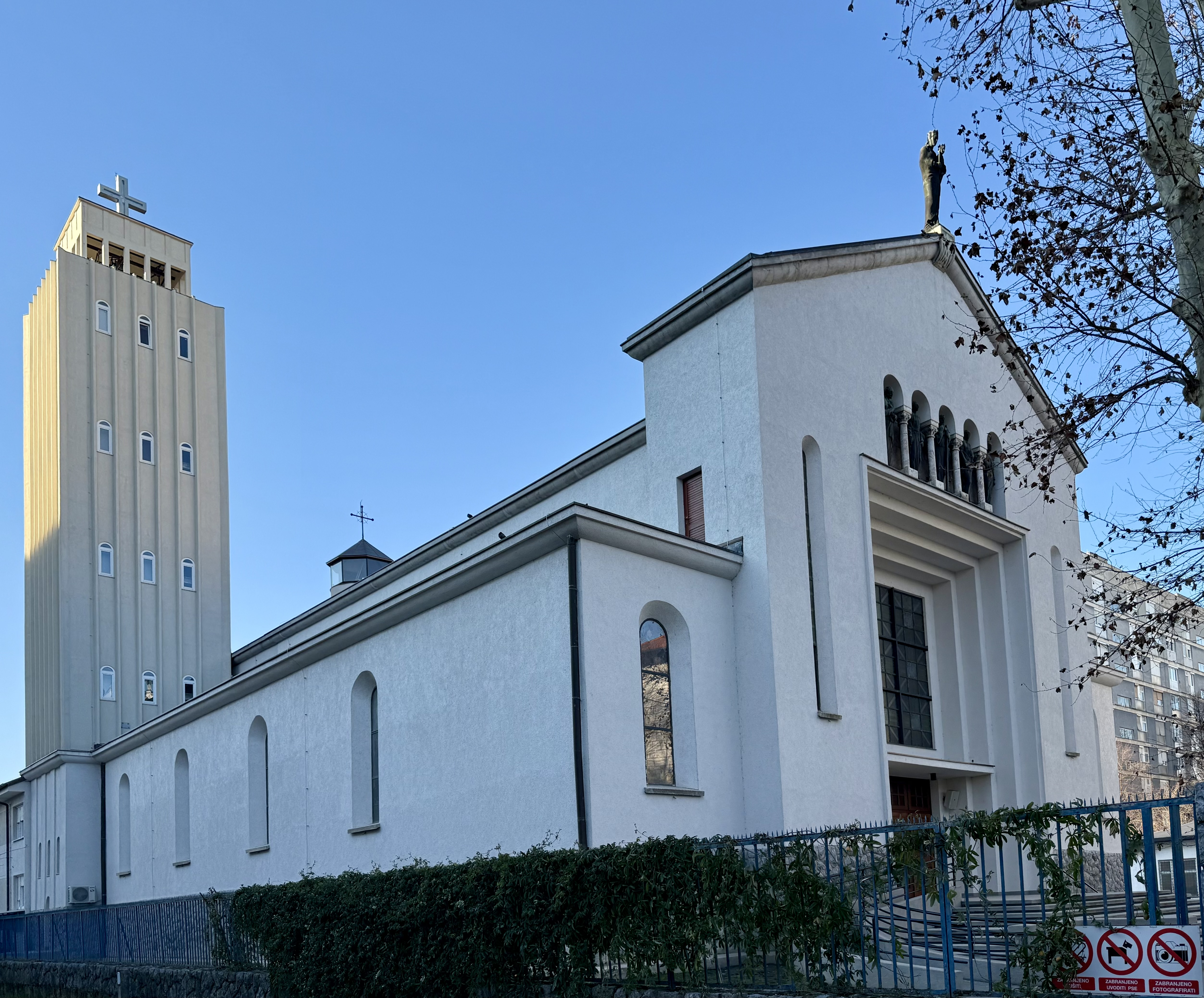
- View of the church
- Church of Mary Help of Christians (Croatian: Župna crkva Blažene Djevice Marije Pomoćnice)
- 45°47′35″N 15°57′08″E
- Location: Zagreb
- Country: Croatia
- Denomination: Roman Catholic

Architecture
- Functional status: Active
- Architect: Zvonimir Požgaj
- Completed: 1944

Church of Mary Help of Christians (Zagreb) (Croatian: Župna crkva Blažene Djevice Marije Pomoćnice na Knežiji) is a Catholic parish church located in the neighbourhood Knežija of Zagreb, Croatia.

The church is located in the neighbourhood Knežija of Zagreb, within a densely built-up residential area.

== History ==
The parish church was built from 1942 to 1944. The interior decoration lasted until 1948. The church was blessed on August 15, 1948, by the auxiliary bishop of Zagreb, Franjo Salis-Seewis.

The church was built according to a 1942 design by architect Zvonimir Požgaj.

The church has been renovated several times throughout history. The major renovation lasted from 1973 to 1978, and upon its completion, the church was consecrated on 15 October 1978 by the Archbishop of Zagreb, Franjo Kuharić. The church and bell tower were damaged in the earthquake of 22 March 2020, and their structural renovation lasted from March 2022 to May 2023.

== Architecture ==
In front of the church is a square, which is spatially defined by the volumes of the church and the neighbouring Salesian monastery.

The entrance to the church is accentuated by a large staircase.

== Gallery ==
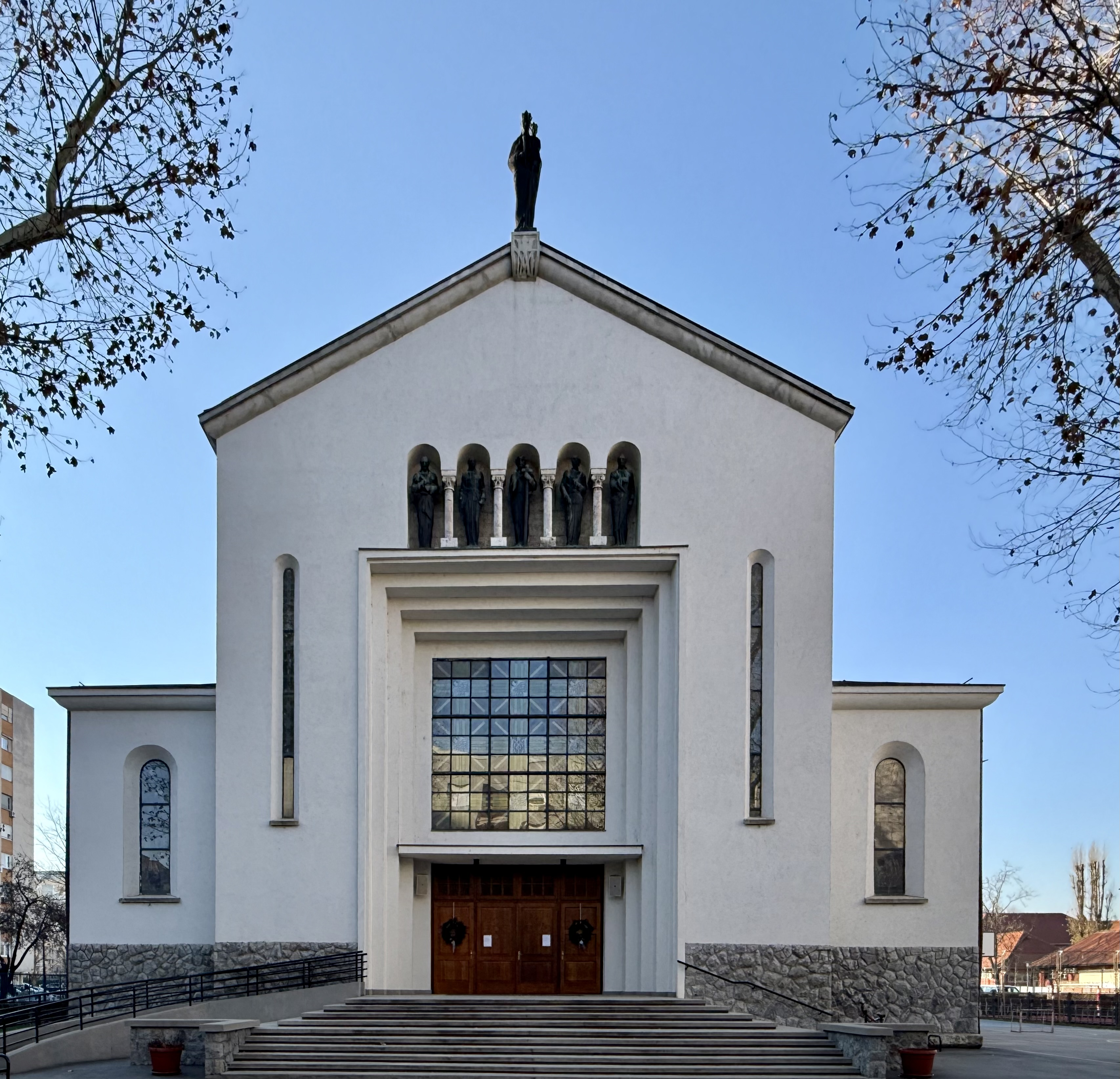
View towards the church from the square

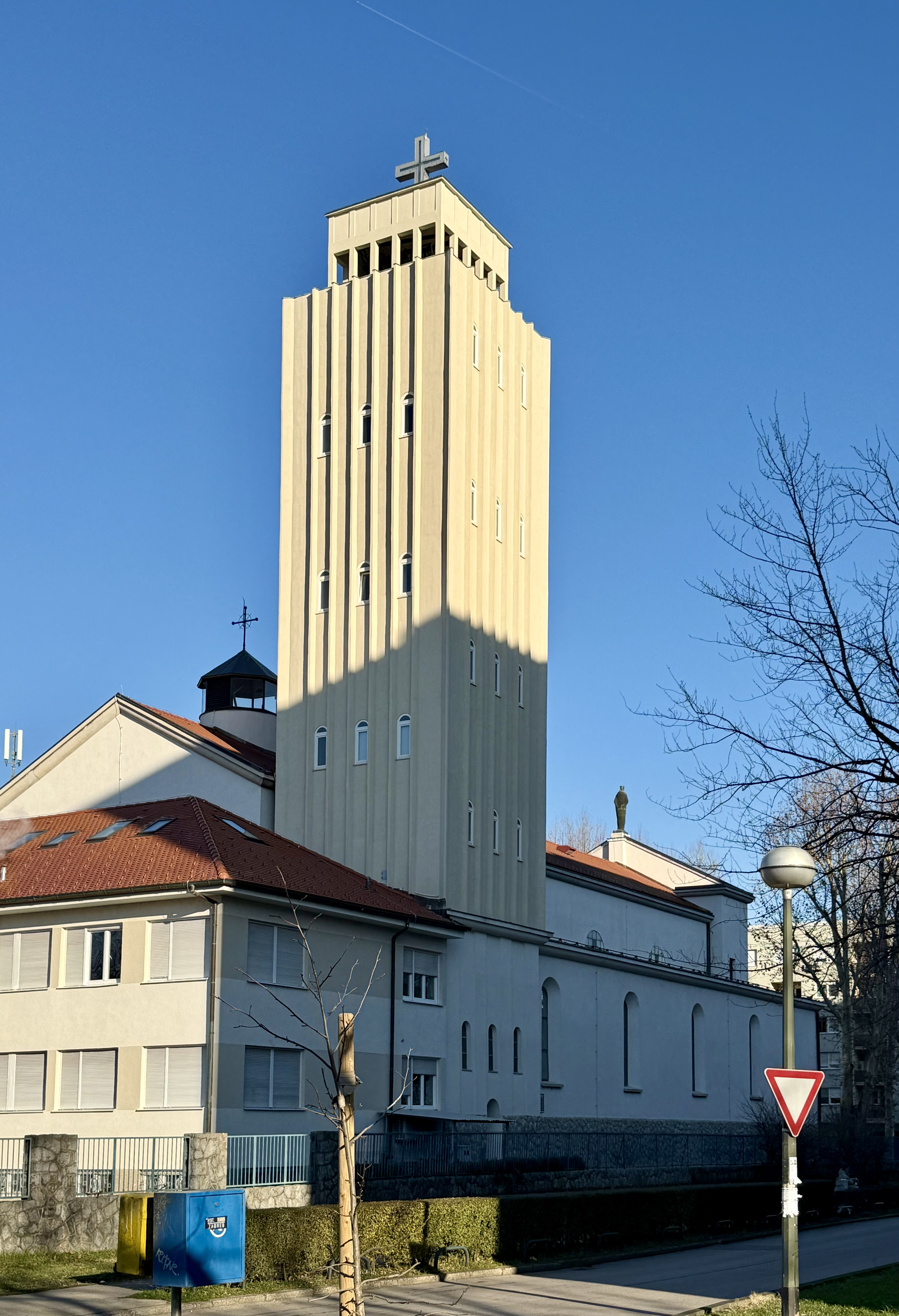
Renovated bell tower

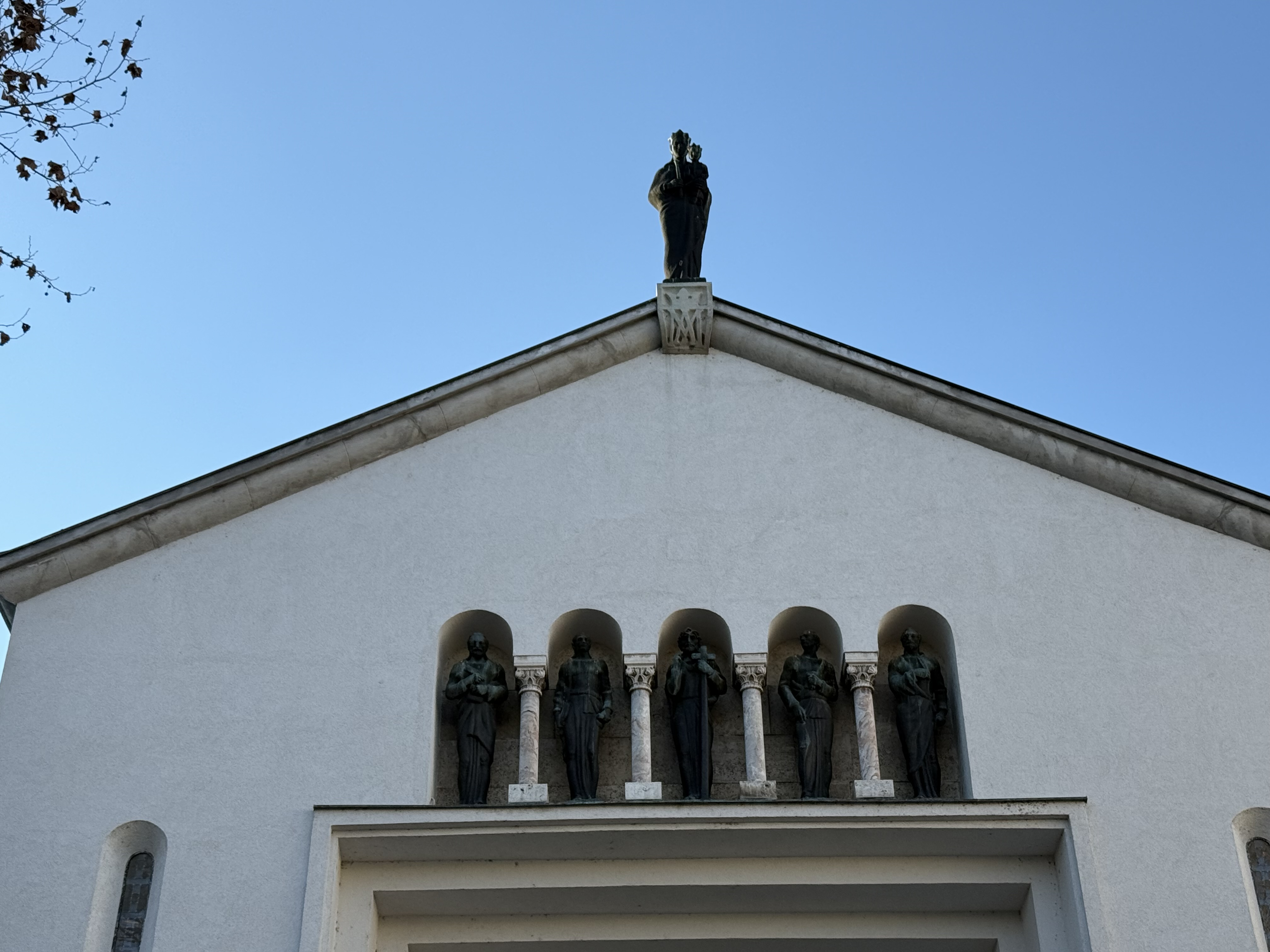
Facade

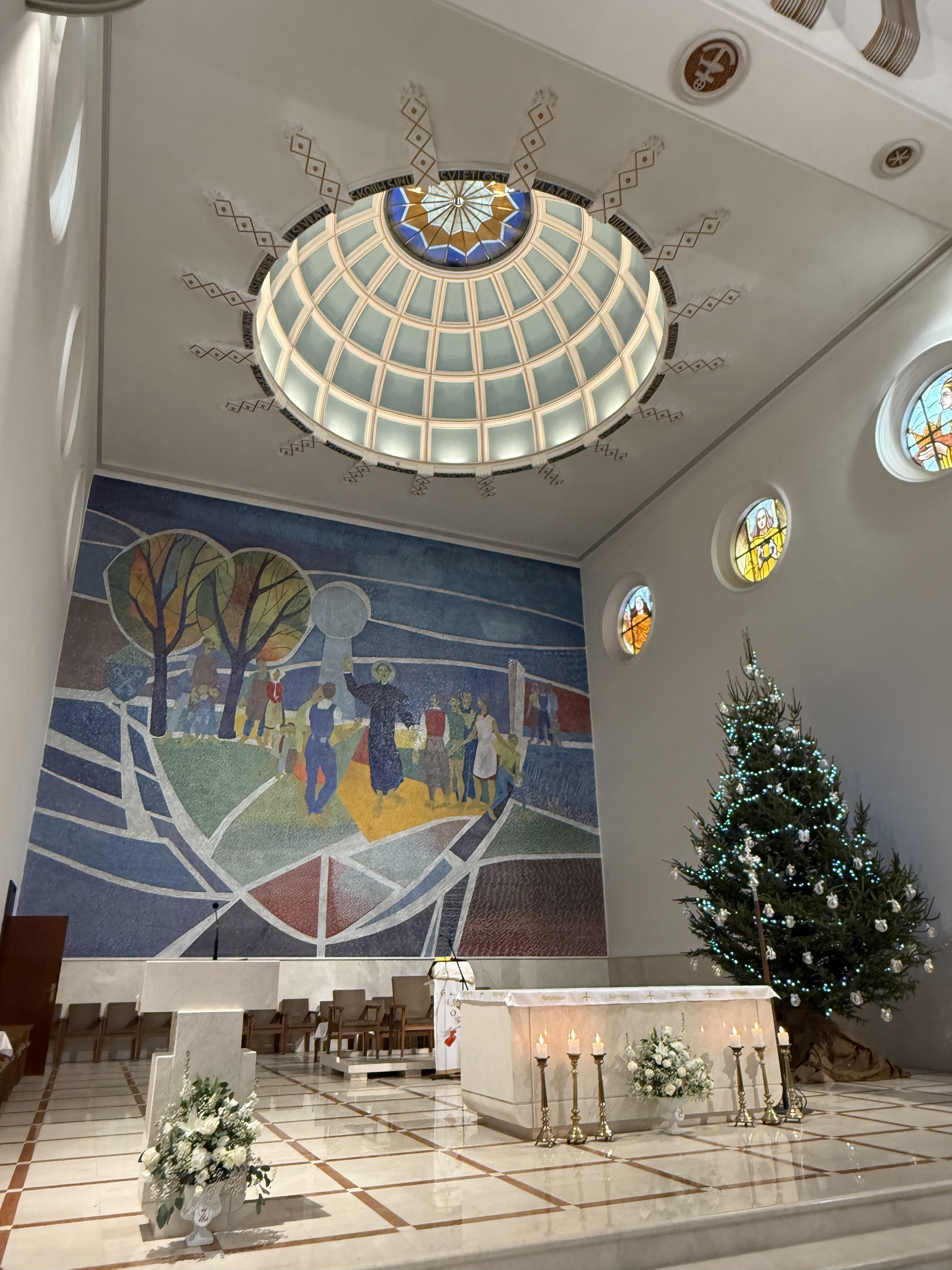
Altar

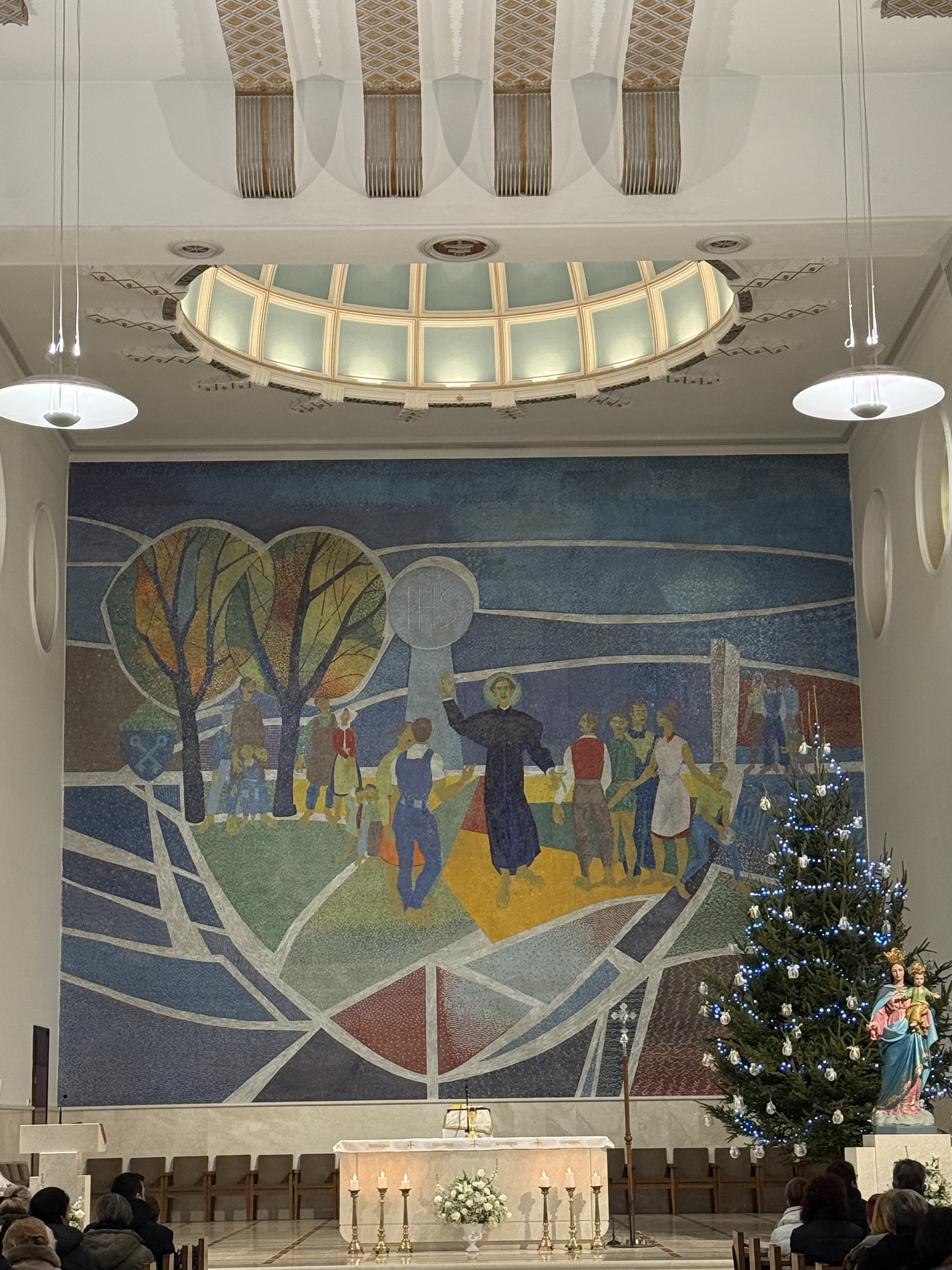
Altar

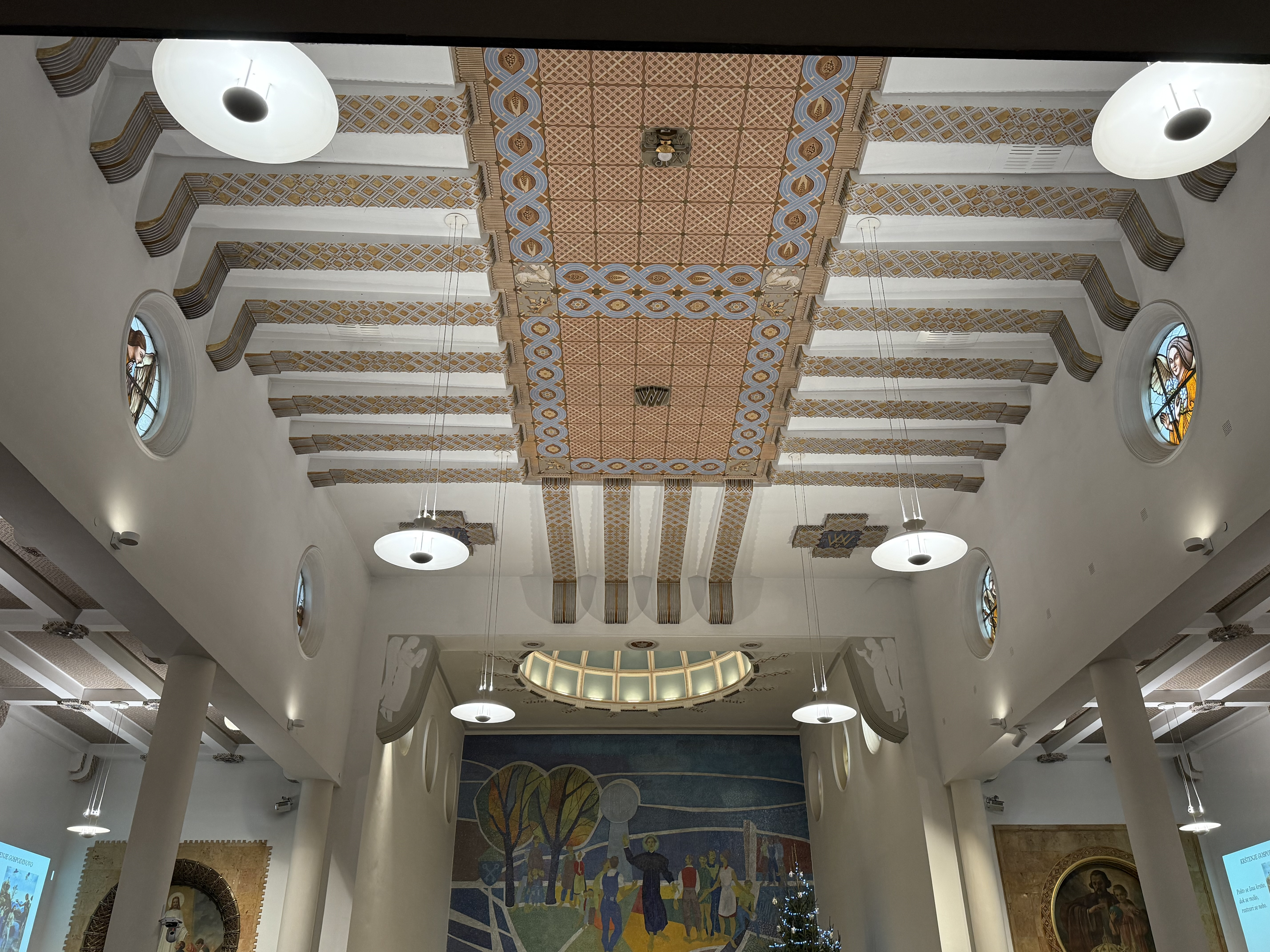
Interior of the church

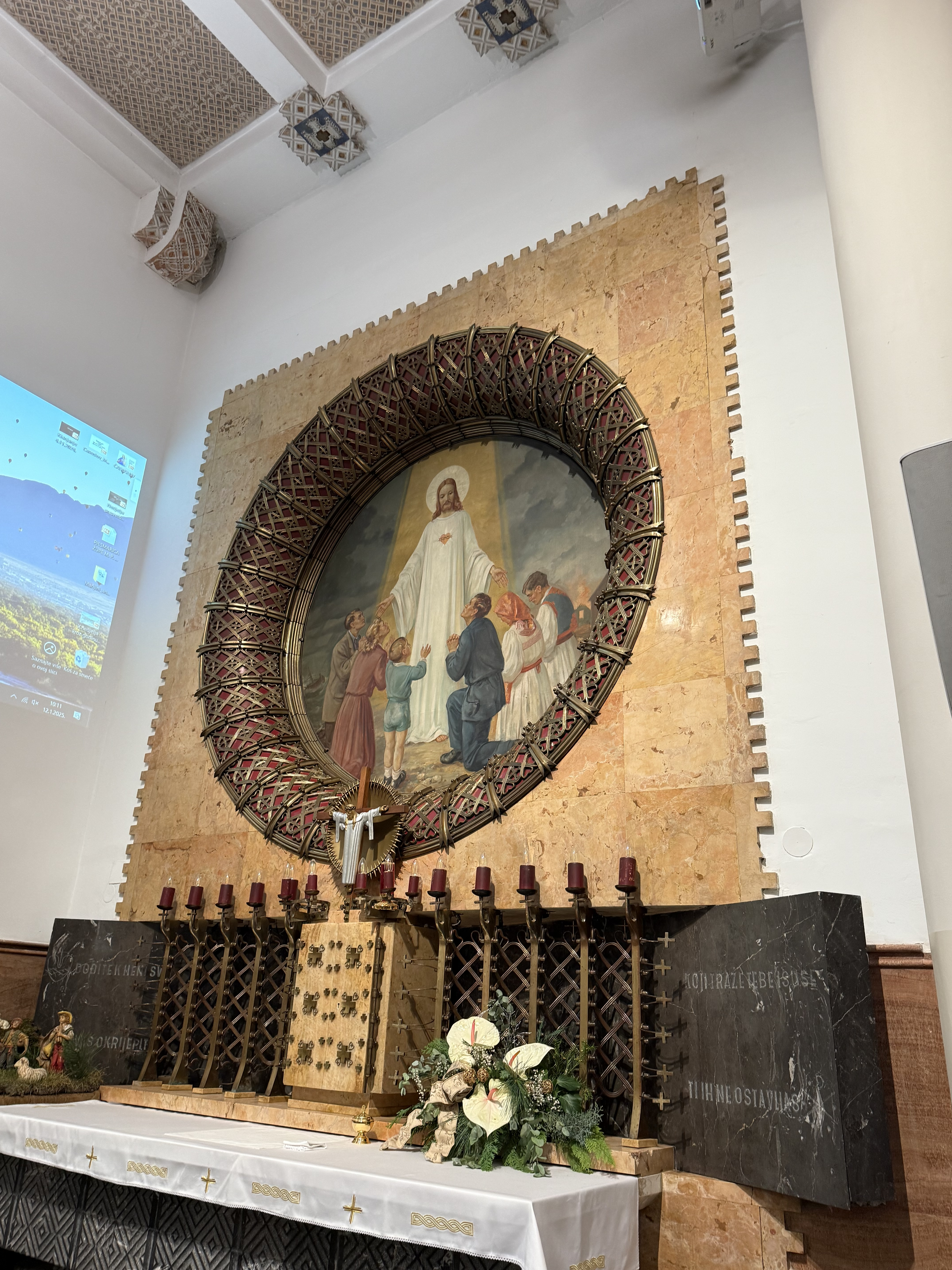
Artwork

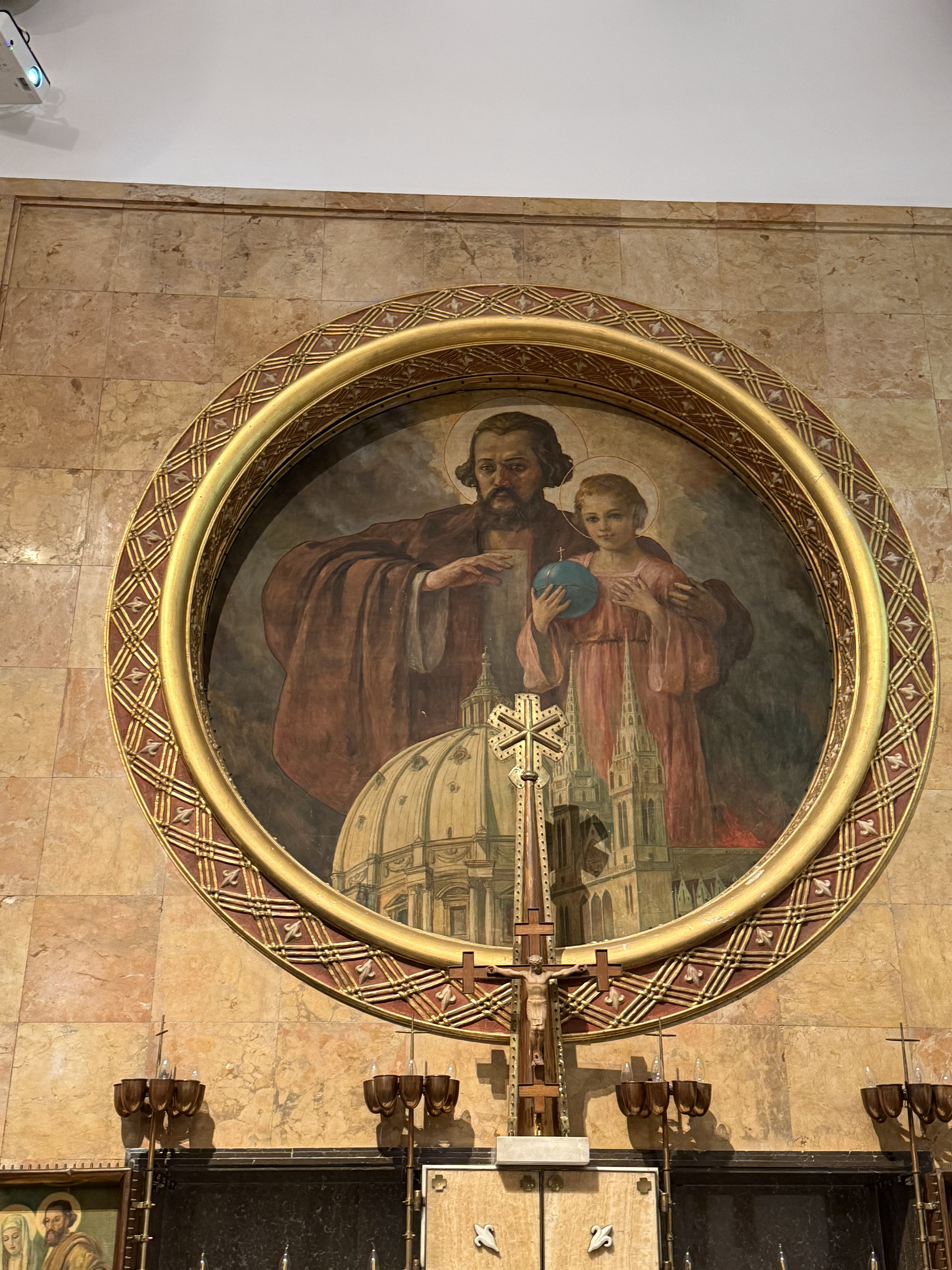
Artwork
