= Strmec, Zagreb =

Strmec
- Village
- Location within Croatia
- Coordinates: 45°42′30″N 15°54′59″E
- Country: Croatia
- County: City of Zagreb
- City District: Brezovica

Area
  - Total: 5.1 sq mi (13.3 km^{2})
- Elevation: 390 ft (119 m)

Population (2021)
  - Total: 585
  - Density: 114/sq mi (44.0/km^{2})
- Time zone: UTC+1 (CET)
  - Summer (DST): UTC+2 (CEST)

Strmec is a village in Croatia. It is formally a settlement (naselje) of Zagreb, the capital of Croatia.

== Demographics ==
According to the 2021 census, its population was 585. According to the 2011 census, it had 645 inhabitants.
