= Havidić Selo =

- Village
- Location within Croatia
- Coordinates: 45°37′33″N 15°56′04″E
- Country: Croatia
- County: City of Zagreb
- City District: Brezovica

Area
  - Total: 0.77 sq mi (2.0 km^{2})
- Elevation: 590 ft (180 m)

Population (2021)
  - Total: 63
  - Density: 82/sq mi (31/km^{2})
- Time zone: UTC+1 (CET)
  - Summer (DST): UTC+2 (CEST)

Havidić Selo is a village in Croatia. It is formally a settlement (naselje) of Zagreb, the capital of Croatia.

== Demographics ==
According to the 2021 census, its population was 63. According to the 2011 census, it had 53 inhabitants.
