= Donji Trpuci =

- Village
- Location within Croatia
- Coordinates: 45°39′59″N 15°56′16″E
- Country: Croatia
- County: City of Zagreb
- City District: Brezovica

Area
  - Total: 3.9 sq mi (10.0 km^{2})
- Elevation: 453 ft (138 m)

Population (2021)
  - Total: 446
  - Density: 116/sq mi (44.6/km^{2})
- Time zone: UTC+1 (CET)
  - Summer (DST): UTC+2 (CEST)

Donji Trpuci is a village in Croatia. It is formally a settlement (naselje) of Zagreb, the capital of Croatia.

== Demographics ==
According to the 2021 census, its population was 446. According to the 2011 census, it had 428 inhabitants.
