= Horvati, Brezovica =

Horvati
- Village
- Interactive map of Horvati
- Location within Croatia
- Coordinates: 45°43′05″N 15°48′45″E
- Country: Croatia
- County: City of Zagreb
- City District: Brezovica

Area
  - Total: 8.0 sq mi (20.8 km^{2})
- Elevation: 489 ft (149 m)

Population (2021)
  - Total: 1,401
  - Density: 174/sq mi (67.4/km^{2})
- Time zone: UTC+1 (CET)
  - Summer (DST): UTC+2 (CEST)
- Postal code: 10436
- Area code: 01

Horvati is a settlement within the City of Zagreb, Croatia. The settlement is administered as a part of the City of Zagreb.

== Demographics ==
According to the 2021 census, its population was 1,401. According to national census of 2011, population of the settlement was 1,490.
