= Horvati, Trešnjevka =

Neighbourhood of Zagreb, Croatia

Horvati
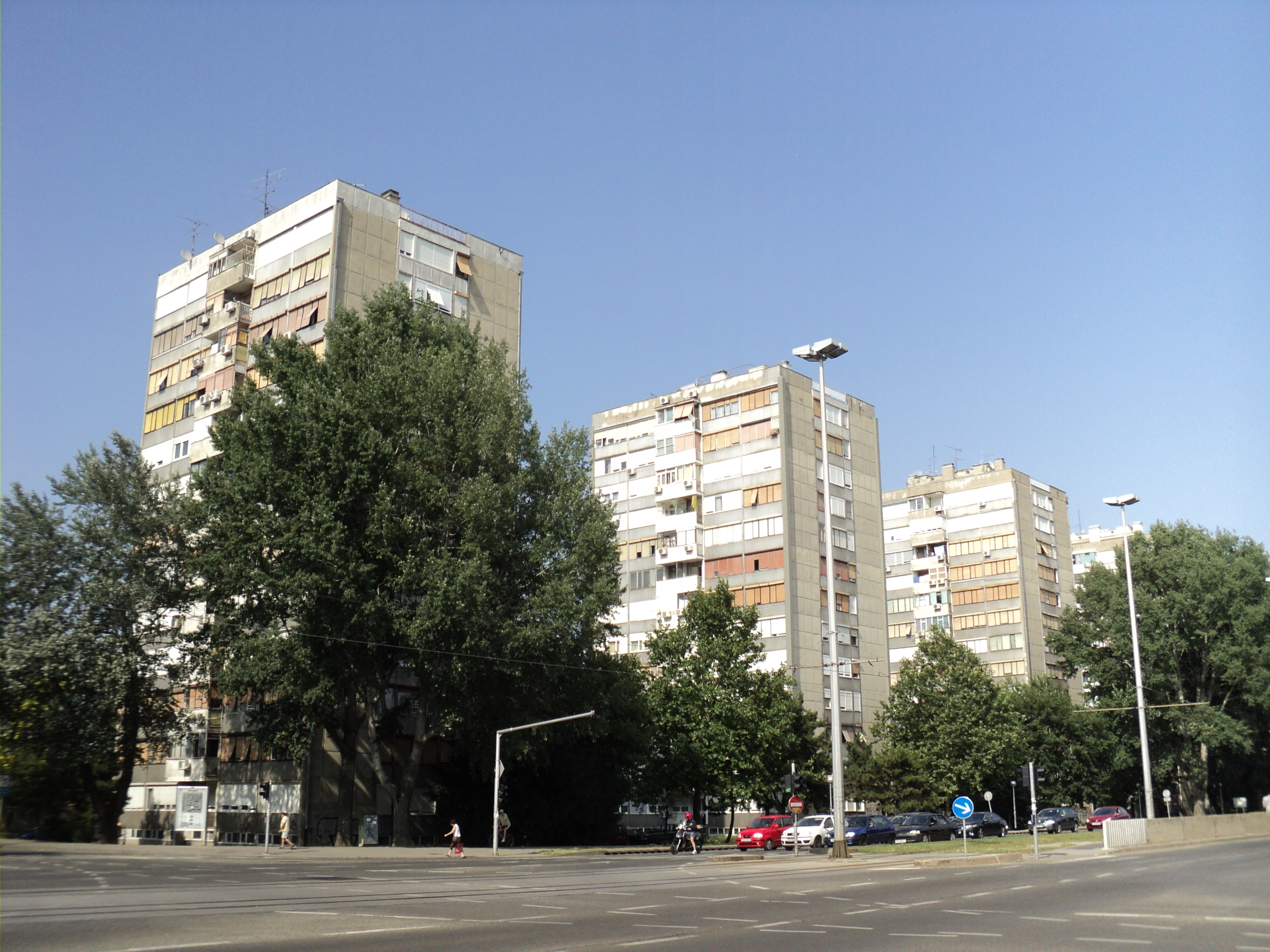
- Residential buildings in Horvati
- Interactive map of Horvati
- Coordinates: 45.788°N 15.953°E

Horvati is a neighbourhood in the southwest of Zagreb, Croatia, within the Trešnjevka – jug district.

The former village of Horvati was first mentioned in the 18th century. In 1895, Horvati was the location of the first elementary school in all of Trešnjevka. Archaeological excavations in the area found traces of an Indo-European agricultural settlement dated to the 11th century BC.

Today, the name of Horvati is maintained in the name of the school, and the local council of Horvati-Srednjaci, but the major redevelopment of the area in the 20th century as well as a number of transit roads, connecting the Selska and Savska streets, caused the area of the old village to be split between the modern-day neighbourhoods of Srednjaci and Knežija.
