= Grančari =

Village in Zagreb, Croatia

- Village
- Location within Croatia
- Coordinates: 45°42′13″N 15°53′34″E
- Country: Croatia
- County: City of Zagreb
- City District: Brezovica

Area
  - Total: 0.35 sq mi (0.9 km^{2})
- Elevation: 404 ft (123 m)

Population (2021)
  - Total: 254
  - Density: 730/sq mi (280/km^{2})
- Time zone: UTC+1 (CET)
  - Summer (DST): UTC+2 (CEST)

Grančari is a village in Croatia. It is formally a settlement (naselje) of Zagreb, the capital of Croatia.

== Demographics ==
According to the 2021 census, its population was 254. According to the 2011 census, it had 221 inhabitants.
