= Dragutin Domjanić =

Croatian poet

Dragutin Milivoj Domjanić
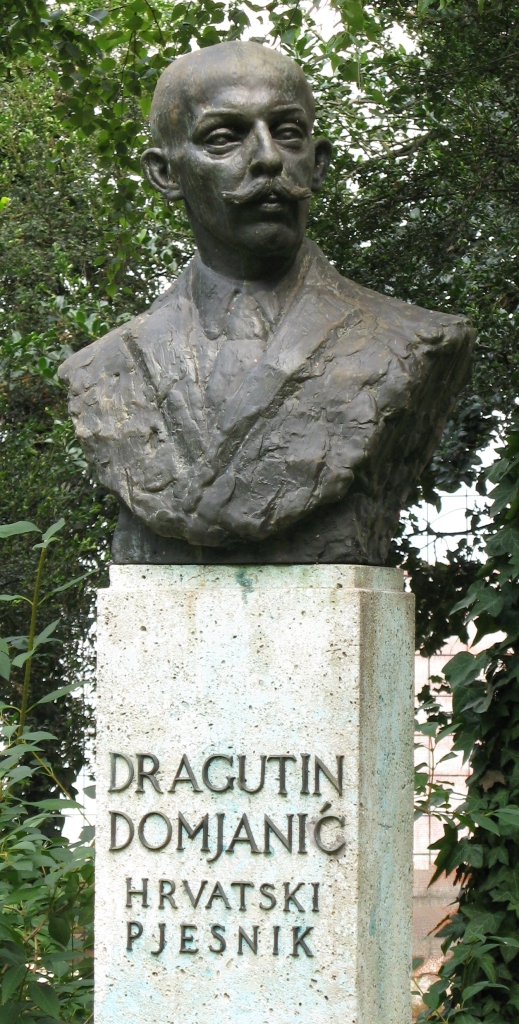
- Domjanić's bust in Strossmayer Square, Zagreb
- Born: 12 September 1875; Krči, Croatia-Slavonia, Austria-Hungary (modern Adamovec, Croatia)
- Died: 7 June 1933 (aged 57); Zagreb, Kingdom of Yugoslavia
- Occupation: Poet
- Writing career
- Language: Croatian

Dragutin Milivoj Domjanić (Croatian pronunciation: [dragǔtin milivǒːj dômjanit͡ɕ], 12th September 1875 – 7th June 1933) was a Croatian poet. He is well known for his work of Domjanic and the poems Fala and Popevke sam slagal.

== Biography ==
Domjanić was born in Krči (now Adamovec, Croatia), a village near the town of Sveti Ivan Zelina. Having graduated in law, he served as a judge in Zagreb and as a counsellor for the Ban's Bench. He was a member of Yugoslav Academy of Sciences and Arts, the president of Matica hrvatska (1921–1926), and the president of Yugoslav PEN Club. In the struggle between the "old" and the "young" in the framework of Croatian Modernism, he sided with the "young". He versified motifs such as spiritual love, intimacy of the nobility mansions, marquises and cavaliers of the past days. He feared the brutality of the present, mourned the world dying off, and had a negative reaction to new ideas.

Domjanić wrote in his native Kajkavian dialect. The most notable works of Domjanić are the poem collection Kipci i popevke, and the poems "Fala" and "Popevke sam slagal", the latter two of which were set to music by Vlaho Paljetak. Croatian composer Ivana Lang also set to music several Domjanić's poems.

All of his poems were written in the Kajkavian literary language of the period, even though his vernacular was the Kajkavian dialect of Adamovec. He also wrote a number of literary accounts and a few prosaic notes.

He is also the author of the lesser-known string puppet play Petrica Kerempuh and the Smart Ass (Kajkavian Croatian: Petrica Kerempuh i spametni osel), writing under the pseudonym Vujec Grga.

Some of his poetic work has been translated into Esperanto by Zvonko Rehoriĉ, such as Sub suno kaj ombro.

He died in Zagreb.

== Works ==
- Poems (Štokavian Croatian: Pjesme), 1909
- Statues and Songs (Kajkavian Croatian: Kipci i popevke), 1917
- In Sun and Shadow (Kajkavian Croatian: V suncu i senci), 1927
- Through Dear Land (Kajkavian Croatian: Po dragomu kraju), 1933

== Sources ==
- Repar, Kristina (April 2017). "Poems by Dragutin Domjanić Set to Music" (PDF). Croatian Journal of Education. 19 (Sp. Ed. 1): 169–190. doi:10.15516/cje.v19i0.2450.

Cultural offices
Preceded by Fran Tućan	President of Matica hrvatska 1921–1926	Succeeded by Albert Bazala
