= Goranec =

Goranec may refer to:

- Goranec, Zagreb, a village near Zagreb, Croatia
- Goranec, Varaždin County, a village near Klenovnik, Croatia
