= Glavnica Gornja =

- Village
- Location within Croatia
- Coordinates: 45°56′05″N 16°08′24″E
- Country: Croatia
- County: City of Zagreb
- City District: Sesvete

Area
  - Total: 0.62 sq mi (1.6 km^{2})
- Elevation: 890 ft (270 m)

Population (2021)
  - Total: 227
  - Density: 370/sq mi (140/km^{2})
- Time zone: UTC+1 (CET)
  - Summer (DST): UTC+2 (CEST)

Glavnica Gornja is a village in Croatia. It is formally a settlement (naselje) of Zagreb, the capital of Croatia.

== Demographics ==
According to the 2021 census, its population was 227. According to the 2011 census, it had 226 inhabitants.
