= Vuger =

Stream in Zagreb

The Vuger (or Vugrovec) is a stream located in Zagreb, Croatia, in the district of Sesvete. Its name is connected to the settlement of Vugrovec, which is located near the stream's source. The lower basin of the Vuger, from its confluence with the Rijeka stream at Srednjak, is also called the Kostanić. In the Middle Ages, the Kostanić was known as the Sopnica river.

Vuger is classified as a Class I waterflow and a potential flood hazard. It is one of the few streams in Zagreb that have not been covered as of yet. Part of the stream forms the western boundary of Sesvete's historic core.
