= Church of the Holy Trinity, Zagreb (Prečko) =

Church of the Holy Trinity (Croatian: Župna crkva Presvetog Trojstva)
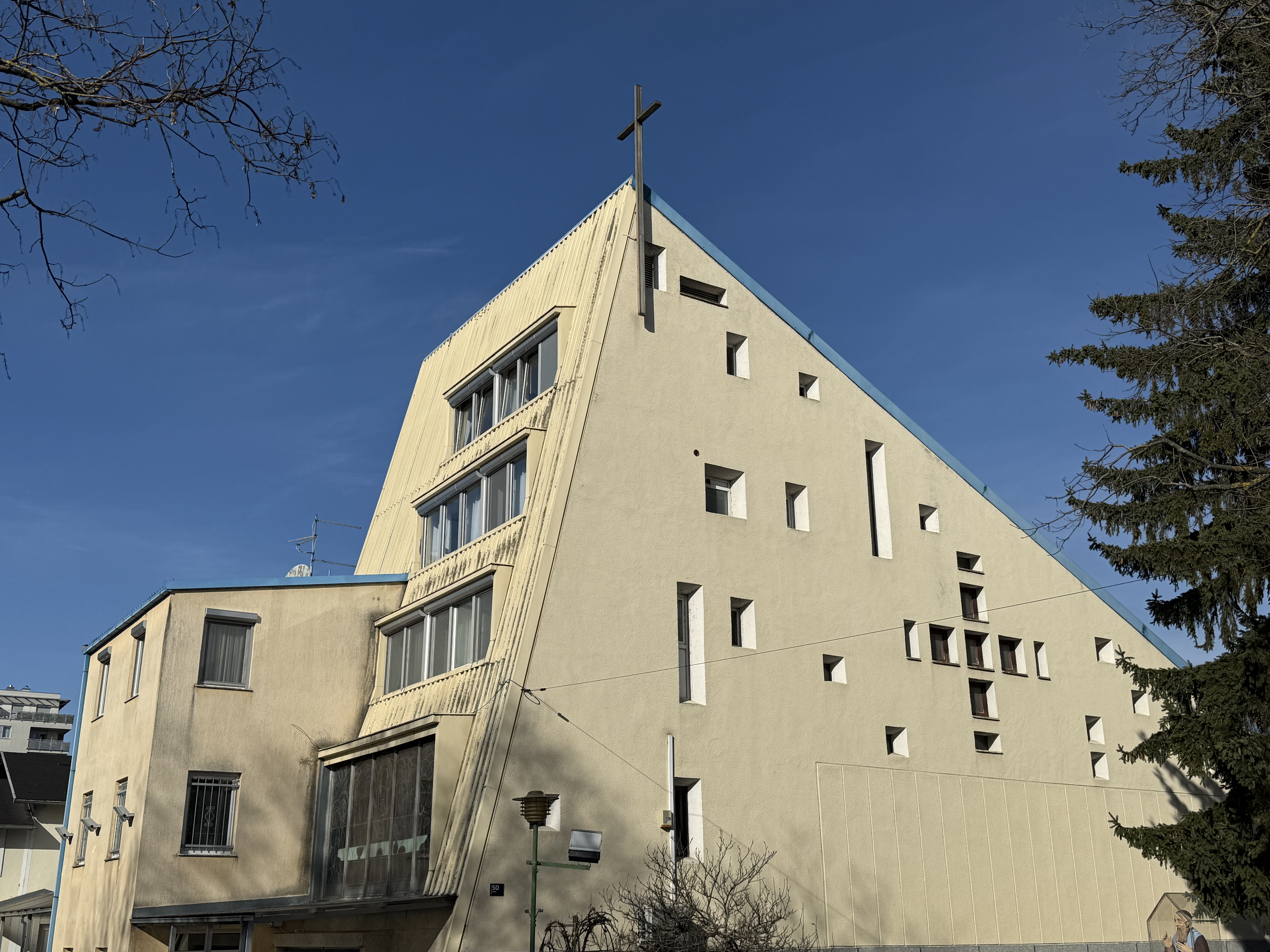
- View of the church
- Church of the Holy Trinity (Croatian: Župna crkva Presvetog Trojstva)
- 45°47′24″N 15°53′59″E
- Location: Zagreb
- Country: Croatia
- Denomination: Roman Catholic

Architecture
- Functional status: Active
- Completed: 1976

Church of the Holy Trinity, Zagreb (Prečko) (Croatian: Župna crkva Presvetog Trojstva u Prečkom) is a Catholic parish church located in the neighbourhood of Prečko in Zagreb, Croatia.

== History ==
The parish church was built in 1975 and 1976. It was blessed by the Archbishop of Zagreb, Franjo Kuharić, in June 1976. The parish church was run by the Jesuits until 1981, after which it was entrusted to diocesan priests.

== Architecture ==
The church was built according to a design by engineers Fučić and Prenčil from 1974. The entire complex consists of the church and the rectory. The access square with its horticultural landscaping has a very strong private character, and a very weak public character, emphasised by the fence separating it from the road and neighbouring areas. The volume of the church faces the square with its rear facade, so the entrance to the church is not formed from the square.

The liturgical space has a longitudinal orientation, which is emphasised by the sloping roof, which achieves a change in the height of the space towards the presbytery. The altar is located in the central part of the sanctuary. To the left of the altar is the ambon, while on the sides is the seat of the priest who leads the mass. Behind the altar is the choir area. The Stations of the Cross are located on the side walls of the area for the faithful.

== Gallery ==
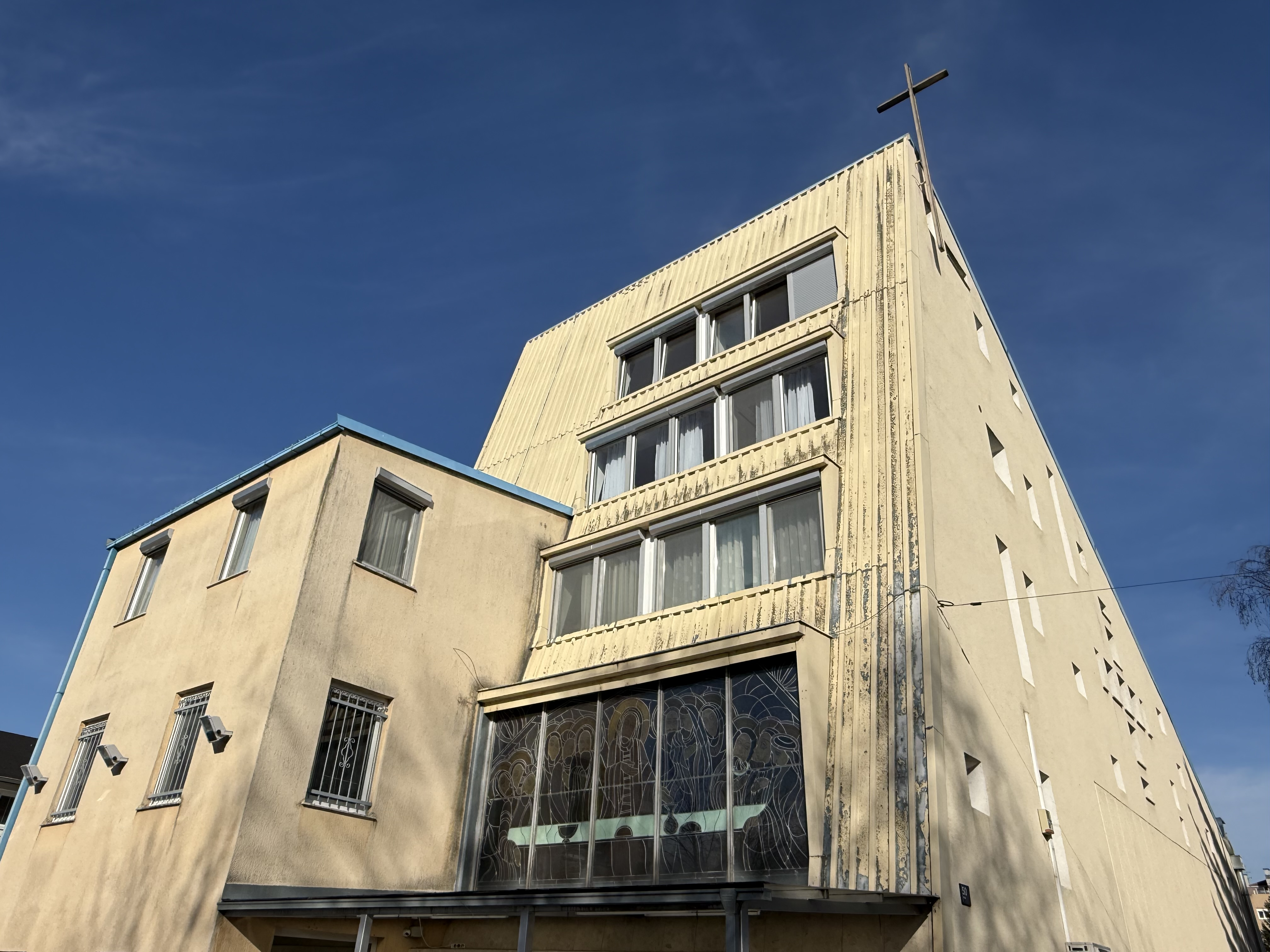
View of the church

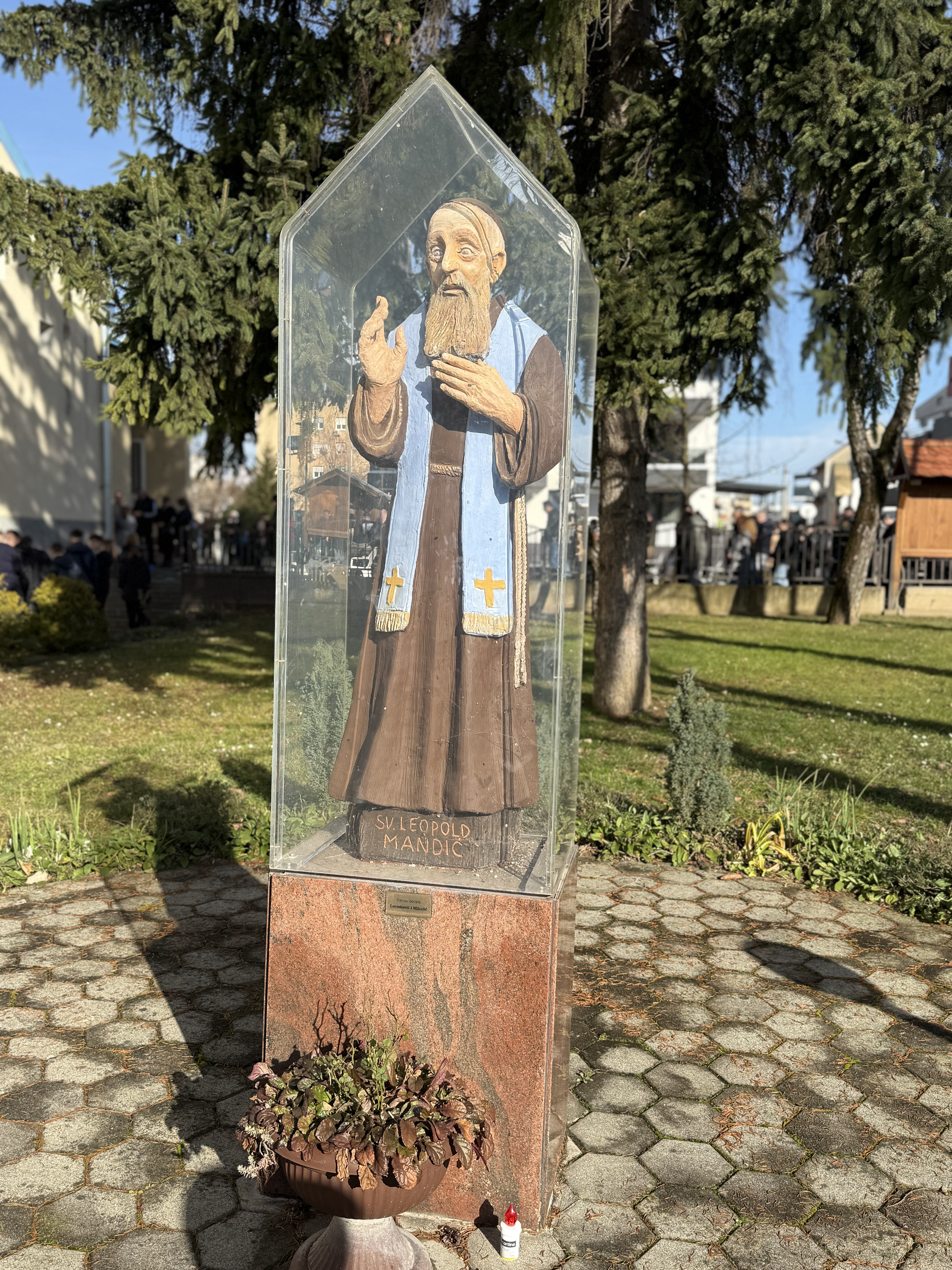
Sculpture of St. Leopold Mandić

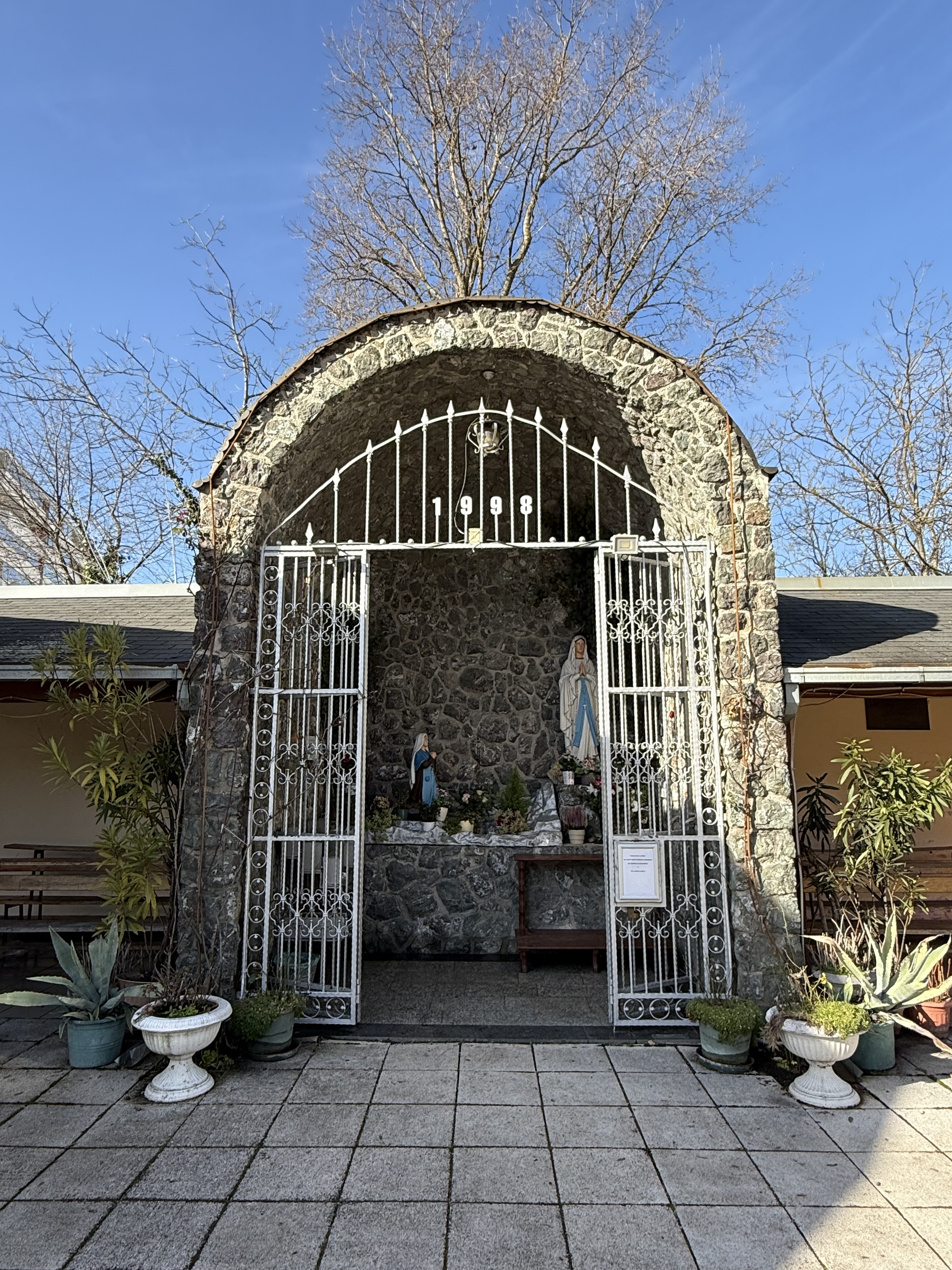
The Grotto of Our Lady of Lourdes, established in 1998

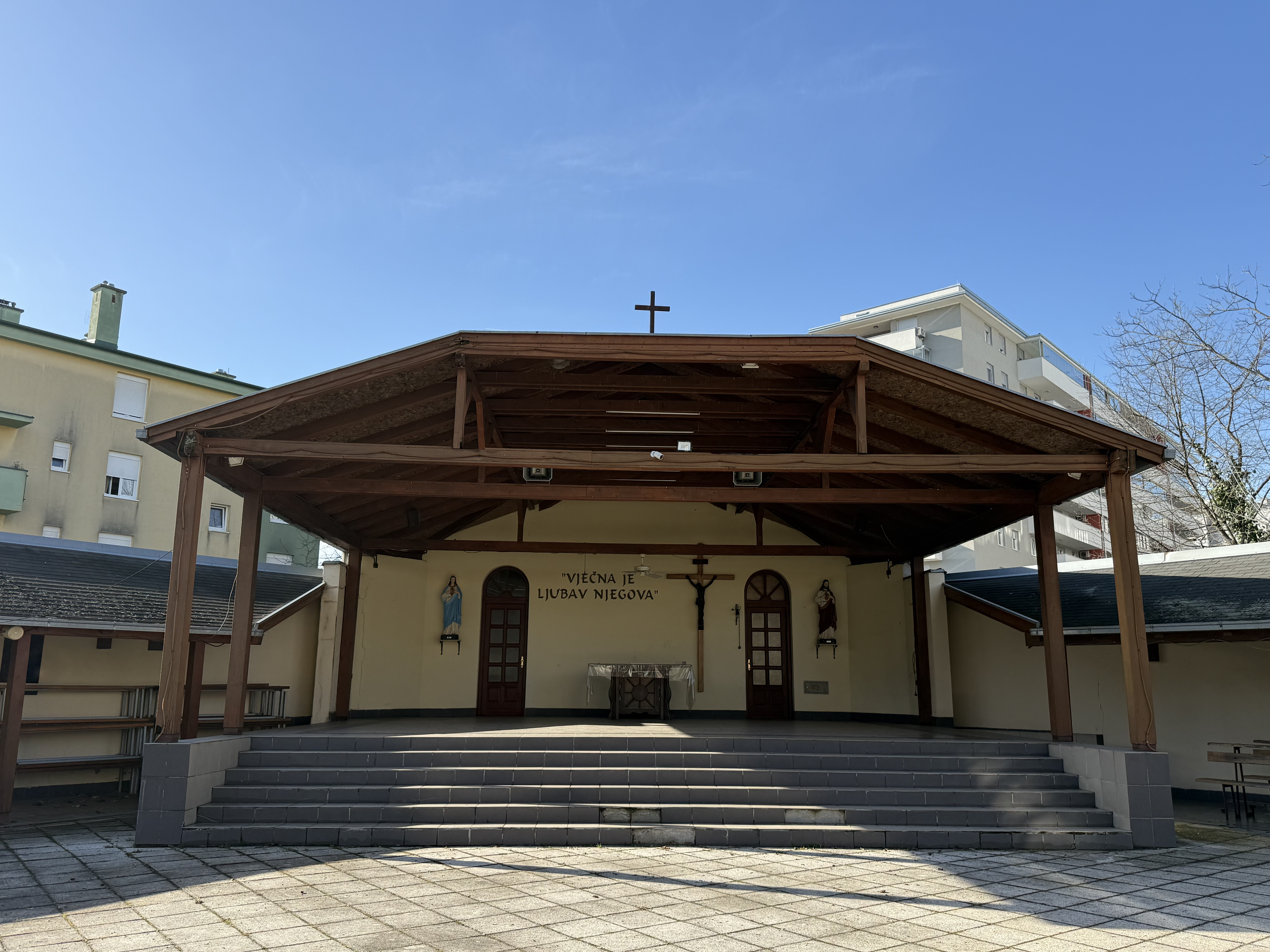
Altar and worship space located in the courtyard
