= Budenec =

- Village
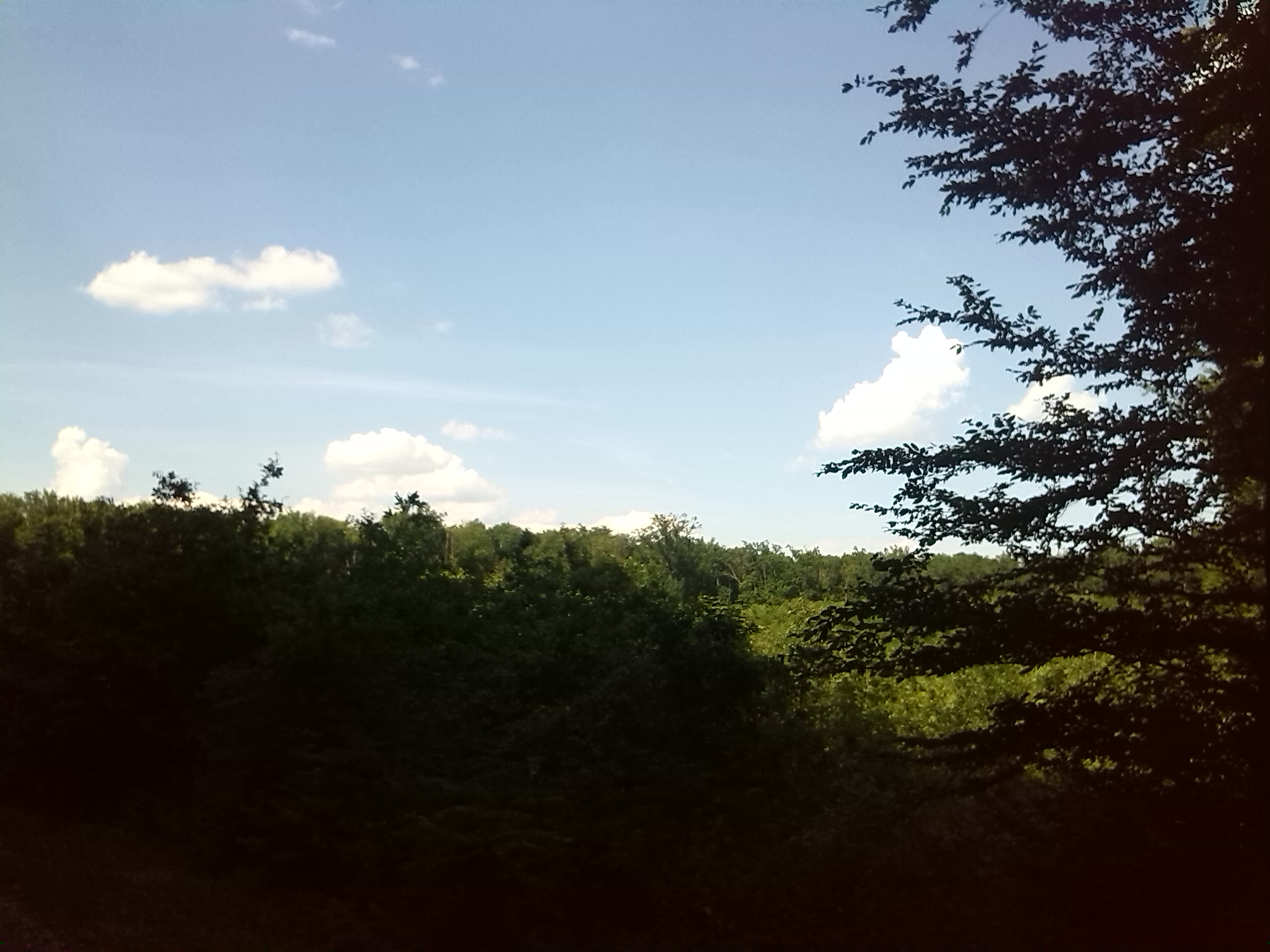
- The Budenec forest

- Location within Croatia
- Coordinates: 45°50′10″N 16°10′34″E
- Country: Croatia
- County: City of Zagreb
- City District: Sesvete

Area
  - Total: 1.1 sq mi (2.8 km^{2})

Population (2021)
  - Total: 367
  - Density: 340/sq mi (130/km^{2})
- Time zone: UTC+1 (CET)
  - Summer (DST): UTC+2 (CEST)

Budenec is a village in Croatia. It is formally a settlement (naselje) of Zagreb, the capital of Croatia.

== Demographics ==
According to the 2021 census, its population was 367. According to the 2011 census, it counted 323 inhabitants.
