= Dumovec =

- Village
- Location within Croatia
- Coordinates: 45°48′40″N 16°09′36″E
- Country: Croatia
- County: City of Zagreb
- City District: Sesvete

Area
  - Total: 1.3 sq mi (3.3 km^{2})
- Elevation: 338 ft (103 m)

Population (2021)
  - Total: 840
  - Density: 660/sq mi (250/km^{2})
- Time zone: UTC+1 (CET)
  - Summer (DST): UTC+2 (CEST)

Dumovec is a village in Croatia. It is formally a settlement (naselje) of Zagreb, the capital of Croatia.

Dumovec is home to the Zagreb shelter for abandoned animals, a pet cemetery, a wildlife sanctuary, and a shelter for feral cats.

== Demographics ==
According to the 2021 census, its population was 840.

Dumovec: Population trends 1857–2021
v

population	93	129	132	151	187	198	192	218	231	233	260	265	401	465	745	903	840
	1857	1869	1880	1890	1900	1910	1921	1931	1948	1953	1961	1971	1981	1991	2001	2011	2021

Sources: Croatian Bureau of Statistics publications
