= Blaguša =

- Village
- Location within Croatia
- Coordinates: 45°56′N 16°08′E
- Country: Croatia
- County: City of Zagreb
- City District: Sesvete

Area
  - Total: 2.2 sq mi (5.8 km^{2})

Population (2021)
  - Total: 524
  - Density: 230/sq mi (90/km^{2})
- Time zone: UTC+1 (CET)
  - Summer (DST): UTC+2 (CEST)

Blaguša is a village in Croatia.

== Demographics ==
According to the 2021 census, its population was 524. According to the 2001 census it had 594 inhabitants.
