= Planina Donja =

- Village
- Location within Croatia
- Coordinates: 45°55′37″N 16°5′10″E
- Country: Croatia
- County: City of Zagreb
- City District: Sesvete

Area
  - Total: 1.9 sq mi (4.9 km^{2})

Population (2021)
  - Total: 492
  - Density: 260/sq mi (100/km^{2})
- Time zone: UTC+1 (CET)
  - Summer (DST): UTC+2 (CEST)

St. George the Martyr Church, Planina Donja, Zagreb

Planina Donja is a village-like part of a Zagreb borough in Croatia.

== Demographics ==
According to the 2021 census, its population was 492.
