= Đurđekovec =

- Village
- Location within Croatia
- Country: Croatia
- County: City of Zagreb
- City District: Sesvete

Area
  - Total: 1.0 sq mi (2.7 km^{2})

Population (2021)
  - Total: 690
  - Density: 660/sq mi (260/km^{2})
- Time zone: UTC+1 (CET)
  - Summer (DST): UTC+2 (CEST)

Đurđekovec is a settlement in the City of Zagreb, Croatia. It is located around 9 km north-east of the city centre of Zagreb and adjacent to the Medvednica mountain.

== Demographics ==
According to the 2021 census, its population was 690. According to the 2011 census, it had 778 inhabitants.
