= Gornji Trpuci =

- Village
- Location within Croatia
- Coordinates: 45°38′45″N 15°54′25″E
- Country: Croatia
- County: City of Zagreb
- City District: Brezovica

Area
  - Total: 1.4 sq mi (3.6 km^{2})
- Elevation: 614 ft (187 m)

Population (2021)
  - Total: 96
  - Density: 69/sq mi (27/km^{2})
- Time zone: UTC+1 (CET)
  - Summer (DST): UTC+2 (CEST)

Gornji Trpuci is a village in Croatia. It is formally a settlement (naselje) of Zagreb, the capital of Croatia.

== Demographics ==
According to the 2021 census, its population was 96. According to the 2011 census, it had 87 inhabitants.
