= Gornji Dragonožec =

- Village
- Location within Croatia
- Coordinates: 45°38′43″N 15°56′10″E
- Country: Croatia
- County: City of Zagreb
- City District: Brezovica

Area
  - Total: 1.2 sq mi (3.1 km^{2})
- Elevation: 604 ft (184 m)

Population (2021)
  - Total: 308
  - Density: 260/sq mi (99/km^{2})
- Time zone: UTC+1 (CET)
  - Summer (DST): UTC+2 (CEST)

Gornji Dragonožec is a village in Croatia. It is formally a settlement (naselje) of Zagreb, the capital of Croatia.

== Demographics ==
According to the 2021 census, its population was 308. According to the 2011 census, it had 295 inhabitants.
