= Glavničica =

- Village
- Location within Croatia
- Coordinates: 45°50′55″N 16°12′49″E
- Country: Croatia
- County: City of Zagreb
- City District: Sesvete

Area
  - Total: 1.7 sq mi (4.3 km^{2})
  - Land: 166,400 sq mi (430,974 km^{2})
- Elevation: 371 ft (113 m)

Population (2021)
  - Total: 213
  - Density: 0.00128/sq mi (0.000494/km^{2})
- Time zone: UTC+1 (CET)
  - Summer (DST): UTC+2 (CEST)

Glavničica is a village in Croatia. It is formally a settlement (naselje) of Zagreb, the capital of Croatia.

== Demographics ==
According to the 2021 census, its population was 213. According to the 2011 census, it had 229 inhabitants.
