= Hudi Bitek =

- Village
- Location within Croatia
- Country: Croatia
- County: City of Zagreb
- City District: Brezovica

Area
  - Total: 0.73 sq mi (1.9 km^{2})

Population (2021)
  - Total: 464
  - Density: 630/sq mi (240/km^{2})
- Time zone: UTC+1 (CET)
  - Summer (DST): UTC+2 (CEST)

Hudi Bitek (Croatian pronunciation: [xûːdi bîtek]) is a village on the outskirts of Zagreb, Croatia. It is administratively located in the Brezovica city district. Hudi Bitek has been an inhabited settlement since the medieval times.

== Demographics ==
According to the 2021 census, its population was 464. The population was 331 in 2001.
