= Lužan =

- Village
- Location within Croatia
- Coordinates: 45°53′02″N 16°11′51″E
- Country: Croatia
- County: City of Zagreb
- City District: Sesvete

Area
  - Total: 2.8 sq mi (7.3 km^{2})
- Elevation: 410 ft (125 m)

Population (2021)
  - Total: 708
  - Density: 250/sq mi (97/km^{2})
- Time zone: UTC+1 (CET)
  - Summer (DST): UTC+2 (CEST)

Lužan is a village in Croatia. It is formally a settlement (naselje) of Zagreb, the capital of Croatia.

== Demographics ==
According to the 2021 census, its population was 708. According to the 2011 census, it had 719 inhabitants.
