= Šašinovec =

- Village
- Location within Croatia
- Coordinates: 45°51′N 16°10′E
- Country: Croatia
- County: City of Zagreb
- City District: Sesvete

Area
  - Total: 3.9 sq mi (10.2 km^{2})

Population (2021)
  - Total: 772
  - Density: 196/sq mi (75.7/km^{2})
- Time zone: UTC+1 (CET)
  - Summer (DST): UTC+2 (CEST)

Šašinovec is a village in Croatia. It is formally a settlement (naselje) of Zagreb, the capital of Croatia.

== Demographics ==
According to the 2021 census, its population was 772.
