= Lipnica, Zagreb =

Lipnica
- Village
- Location within Croatia
- Coordinates: 45°37′50″N 15°55′19″E
- Country: Croatia
- County: City of Zagreb
- City District: Brezovica

Area
  - Total: 1.4 sq mi (3.5 km^{2})
- Elevation: 548 ft (167 m)

Population (2021)
  - Total: 221
  - Density: 160/sq mi (63/km^{2})
- Time zone: UTC+1 (CET)
  - Summer (DST): UTC+2 (CEST)

Lipnica is a village in Croatia. It is formally a settlement (naselje) of Zagreb, the capital of Croatia.

== Demographics ==
According to the 2021 census, its population was 221. According to the 2011 census, it had 207 inhabitants.
