= Vrbani, Zagreb =

Neighbourhood of Zagreb, Croatia

Coordinates: 45°47.4′N 15°54.2′E

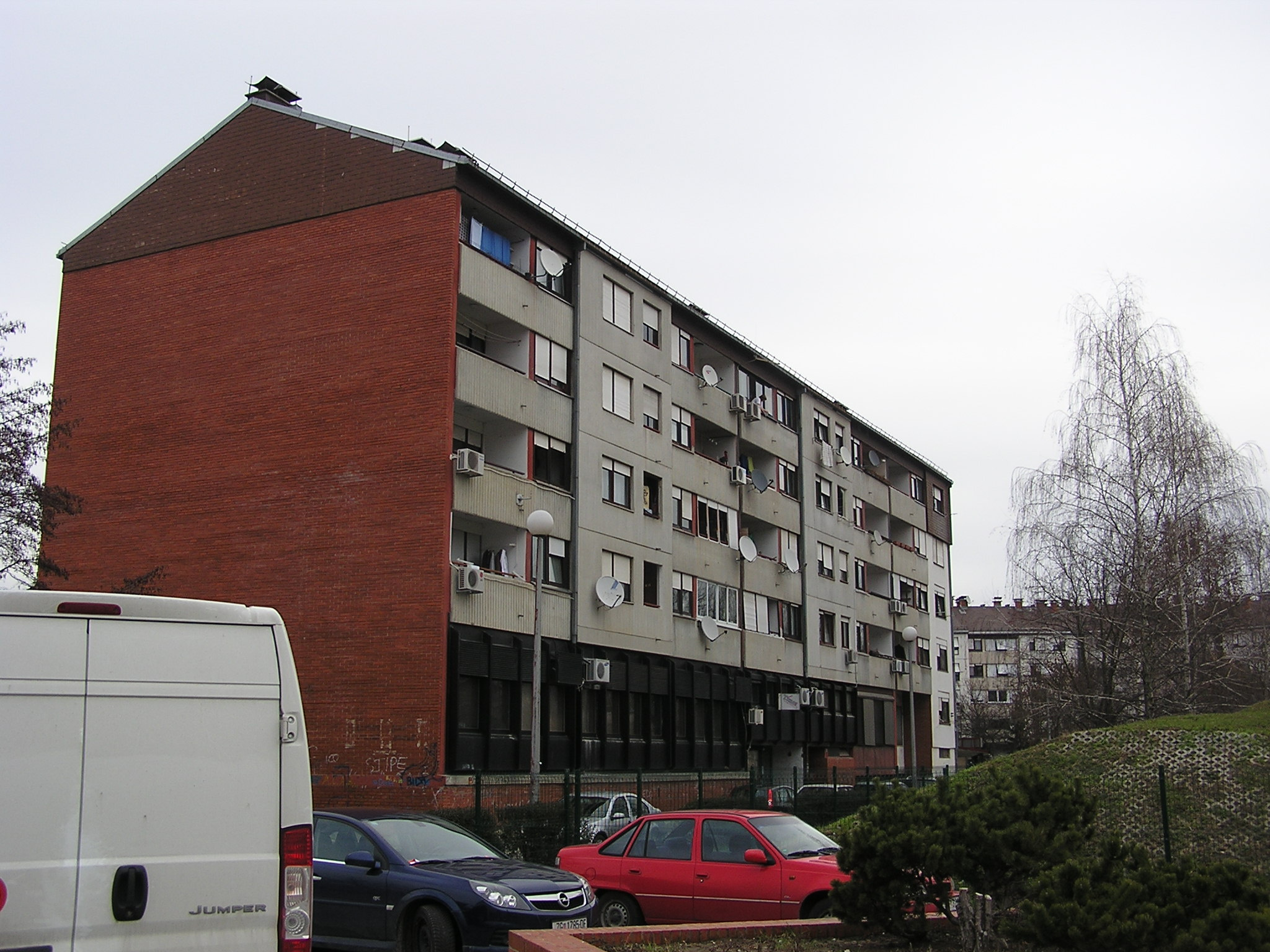
An apartment building in Vrbani.

Vrbani is a neighborhood in Trešnjevka - jug city district in the southwestern part of Zagreb, Croatia. The area covered by the local city council Vrbani has around 10,093 inhabitants.

The borders of Vrbani are Horvaćanska Street on the south with Jarun, Hrvatski Sokol Street with Staglišće on the east, Zagrebačka Avenue with Rudeš on the north and Petrovaradinska Street on the west with Prečko. Vrbani, in the wider sense, also includes the newly built buildings between lake Jarun and Horvaćanska Street.
