= Trešnjevka – sjever =

City district of Zagreb, Croatia

Coordinates: 45°48′1.81″N 15°55′36.16″E

- District of Zagreb
- Trešnjevka – sjever as a part of Zagreb
- Country: Croatia
- County/City: Zagreb

Government
  - Council President: Roman Karaturović (M!-SDP)
  - District Council: Composition (19): M!-SDP (12); HDZ-DP-HSU-HSS (3); Marija Selak Raspudić list (3); Only Croatia-DOMiNO-HS-Blok (1)

Area
  - Total: 5.809 km^{2} (2.243 sq mi)

Population (2021)
  - Total: 52,974
  - Density: 9,119/km^{2} (23,620/sq mi)

Map

Trešnjevka – sjever (Croatian pronunciation: [trêʃɲeːʋka sjêʋer], lit. 'Trešnjevka – north') is one of the districts of Zagreb, Croatia. It is located in the western part of the city and has 55,425 inhabitants according to the 2011 census.

The district encompasses the northern (Croatian: sjever) part of the traditional Trešnjevka neighbourhood, separated from the southern part (Croatian: jug) by the Zagrebačka Avenue.

== List of neighborhoods in Trešnjevka – sjever ==
- Ciglenica
- Ljubljanica
- Pongračevo
- Remiza / Vurovčica
- Rudeš
- Stara Trešnjevka
- "Ivan Starčević" or Voltino
