= Vlaho Paljetak =

Croatian composer (1893–1944)

Vlaho Paljetak (7 August 1893 – 2 October 1944) was a Croatian composer. He was born in Dubrovnik in the Austro-Hungarian Empire which is now part of modern Croatia. Vlaho was educated in Arbanasi, near Zadar, and worked as a teacher in Hvar and Vis. He studied singing and violin and was a self-taught guitarist. For a time he was a member of a small orchestra in Split which was run by Jakov Gotovac and Ivo Tijardović. He went to Zagreb where he wanted to become an operatic tenor.

Vlaho started to compose songs and chansons. He recorded 60 songs, amongst them are: "The Blue Adriatic Sea", "From One Beautiful Night", "Under the Old Cypress Trees", "Adio Mare", "Fala" (music to Dragutin Domjanić's poem) and "Marijana" (co-authored with Svetozar Šišić).

== See also ==
- Music of Croatia
- Dubrovnik
- Dalmatia
- Dragutin Domjanic
