= Vuger Selo =

- Village
- Location within Croatia
- Coordinates: 45°52′42″N 16°06′14″E
- Country: Croatia
- County: City of Zagreb
- Elevation: 177 m (581 ft)

Population (2011)
  - Total: 273
- Time zone: UTC+1 (CET)
  - Summer (DST): UTC+2 (CEST)

Vuger Selo is a village in Croatia, formerly part of City of Zagreb. For the 2021 Croatian census, it has been merged with Vugrovec Donji and Kućanec into a new settlement named Vugrovec.
