= Srednjaci =

Neighbourhood of Zagreb, Croatia

- Interactive map of Srednjaci

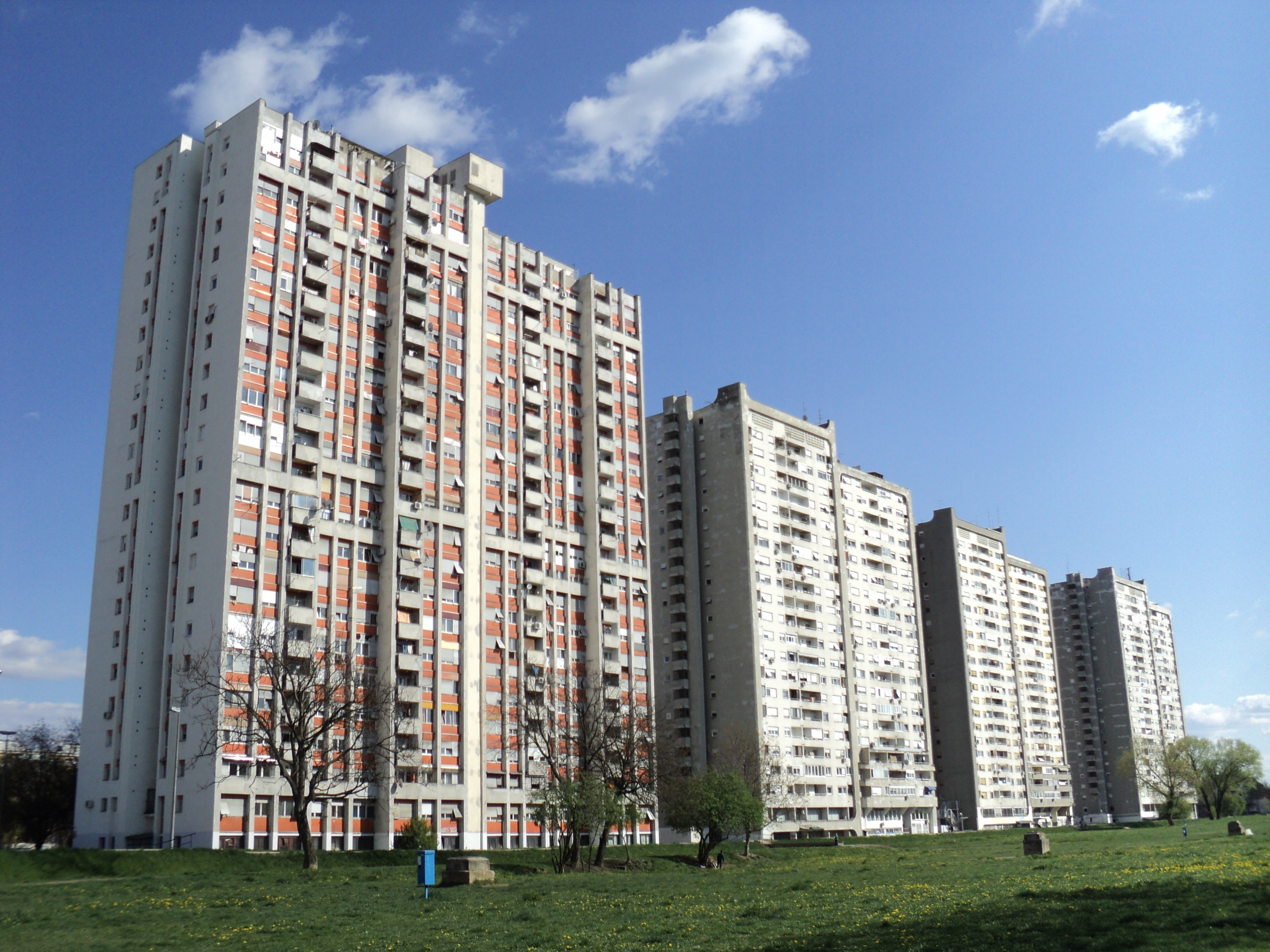
Skyscrapers in Srednjaci, Zagreb.

Srednjaci is a neighbourhood in the southwest of Zagreb, Croatia, within the Trešnjevka – jug district. The area of the local city council of Horvati - Srednjaci has a population of 10,735 (census 2021).

The former village of Horvati was first mentioned in the 18th century. The area of Srednjaci was settled after the end of feudalism in the latter half of the 19th century. The core area of old Srednjaci is located to the northwest of historical Horvati, which is today largely located in the neighbouring Knežija.
