= Adamovec =

- Village
- Location within Croatia
- Coordinates: 45°54′14″N 16°10′19″E
- Country: Croatia
- County: City of Zagreb
- City District: Sesvete

Area
  - Total: 3.0 sq mi (7.8 km^{2})

Population (2021)
  - Total: 900
  - Density: 300/sq mi (120/km^{2})
- Time zone: UTC+1 (CET)
  - Summer (DST): UTC+2 (CEST)

Adamovec is a small town in central Croatia, north of Sesvete and southwest of Sveti Ivan Zelina. It is formally a settlement (naselje) of Zagreb, the capital of Croatia.

== Demographics ==
According to the 2021 census, its population was 900. According to the 2001 census, Adamovec counted 984 inhabitants.
