= Belovar =

- Village
- Location within Croatia
- Country: Croatia
- County: City of Zagreb
- City District: Sesvete

Area
  - Total: 1.4 sq mi (3.6 km^{2})

Population (2021)
  - Total: 354
  - Density: 250/sq mi (98/km^{2})
- Time zone: UTC+1 (CET)
  - Summer (DST): UTC+2 (CEST)

Belovar is a settlement (naselje) located within the Sesvete city district of Zagreb, the capital of Croatia.

== Demographics ==
According to the 2021 census, its population was 354. According to the 2011 census, the settlement had 378 inhabitants.
