= Kućanec =

- Village
- Location within Croatia
- Coordinates: 45°52′48″N 16°06′45″E
- Country: Croatia
- County: City of Zagreb
- Elevation: 181 m (594 ft)

Population (2011)
  - Total: 228
- Time zone: UTC+1 (CET)
  - Summer (DST): UTC+2 (CEST)

Kućanec is a village in Croatia, formerly part of City of Zagreb. For the 2021 Croatian census it has been merged with Vugrovec Donji and Vuger Selo into a new settlement named Vugrovec.
