= Goranec, Zagreb =

Goranec
- Village
- Location within Croatia
- Coordinates: 45°53′51″N 16°04′46″E
- Country: Croatia
- County: City of Zagreb
- City District: Sesvete

Area
  - Total: 1.4 sq mi (3.6 km^{2})
- Elevation: 873 ft (266 m)

Population (2021)
  - Total: 10
  - Density: 7.2/sq mi (2.8/km^{2})
- Time zone: UTC+1 (CET)
  - Summer (DST): UTC+2 (CEST)

Goranec is a village in Croatia. It is formally a settlement (naselje) of Zagreb, the capital of Croatia.

== Demographics ==
According to the 2021 census, its population was 297. According to the 2011 census, it had 449 inhabitants.
