= Stara Trešnjevka =

Neighbourhood of Zagreb, Croatia

- Interactive map of Stara Trešnjevka

Stara Trešnjevka (lit. 'Old Trešnjevka') is a neighbourhood in the western part of Zagreb, Croatia, within the Trešnjevka – sjever district. The area of the local city council of Stara Trešnjevka has a population of 6,499 (census 2021).

The estates called Črešnjevke which gave the name to Trešnjevka were first mentioned in the 18th century. The area started to urbanize in the interwar period. The tram track was built in the Ozaljska street in 1935. The area became a city municipality after the Second World War.
