= Brezovica, Zagreb =

Brezovica
- City District
- Brezovica as a part of Zagreb

- Location within Croatia
- Country: Croatia
- County: City of Zagreb

Area
  - Total: 1.7 sq mi (4.5 km^{2})

Population (2021)
  - Total: 642
  - Density: 370/sq mi (140/km^{2})
- Time zone: UTC+1 (CET)
  - Summer (DST): UTC+2 (CEST)

Brezovica (Croatian pronunciation: [brêzoʋit͡sa]) is the southernmost city district of Zagreb, named after the eponymous settlement within the district. It is also the city’s most distinctly suburban district, consisting of a number of settlements that naturally gravitate toward southern Zagreb, particularly Novi Zagreb.

== History ==
For the fortification of Ivanić in 1598, Brezovica had to supply 4 carts.

== Demographics ==
The district had a total population of 12,030 inhabitants, while the settlement itself has a population of 642 according to the 2021 census while it had 594 (as of 2011).

It is one of the more rural districts in Zagreb. The A1 highway passes through Brezovica, although it has no exits there.

Of note is Dvorac Brezovica, an eighteenth-century chateau now owned by the Zagreb Archdiocese. Dvorac Brezovica (castle) has been abandoned for several years and the building and its surroundings have fallen into disrepair.

== List of neighborhoods in Brezovica ==
- Brebernica
- Demerje
- Donji Dragonožec
- Donji Trpuci
- Goli Breg
- Gornji Dragonožec
- Gornji Trpuci
- Grančari
- Havidić Selo
- Horvati
- Hudi Bitek
- Kupinečki Kraljevec
- Lipnica
- Odranski Obrež
- Strmec
- Starjak
- Zadvorsko
