= Vugrovec Gornji =

- Village
- Location within Croatia
- Coordinates: 45°53′35″N 16°05′51″E
- Country: Croatia
- County: City of Zagreb
- City District: Sesvete

Area
  - Total: 0.81 sq mi (2.1 km^{2})
- Elevation: 702 ft (214 m)

Population (2021)
  - Total: 305
  - Density: 380/sq mi (150/km^{2})
- Time zone: UTC+1 (CET)
  - Summer (DST): UTC+2 (CEST)

Vugrovec Gornji is a village in Croatia. It is formally a settlement (naselje) of Zagreb, the capital of Croatia.

== Demographics ==
According to the 2021 census, its population was 305. According to the 2011 census, it had 357 inhabitants.
