= Sesvete =

- City district
- Gradska četvrt Sesvete; City District of Sesvete
- Sesvete district within Zagreb
- Coordinates: 45°49′37″N 16°6′40″E
- Country: Croatia
- County: City of Zagreb

Government
  - President of the City District Council: Stjepan Kezerić (BM 365)

Area
  - City district: 165.3 km^{2} (63.8 sq mi)
  - Urban: 36.2 km^{2} (14.0 sq mi)

Population (2021)
  - City district: 70,800
  - Density: 428/km^{2} (1,110/sq mi)
  - Urban: 55,313
  - Urban density: 1,530/km^{2} (3,960/sq mi)
- Time zone: UTC+1 (CET)
  - Summer (DST): UTC+2 (CEST)
- Postal code: 10360
- Area code: 01
- Vehicle registration: ZG

Sesvete (Croatian pronunciation: [sêsʋete]) is the easternmost city district of Zagreb, Croatia.

Sesvete combines an urban centre with suburban neighbourhoods and rural settlements in its northern area. The district extends from lowlands in the south to the southern foothills of Medvednica in the north.

Industrialisation and inward migration accelerated urbanisation from the mid-1960s, joining formerly separate settlements along the Zagreb–Dugo Selo road into a continuous built-up area.

The urban centre of Sesvete serves as an important economic and transport hub for the eastern part of Zagreb.

== Demographics ==
Historical population
Year	Pop.	±%
1857	1,047	—
1869	1,224	+16.9%
1880	1,345	+9.9%
1890	1,611	+19.8%
1900	1,863	+15.6%
1910	1,915	+2.8%
1921	2,102	+9.8%
1931	2,505	+19.2%
1948	2,898	+15.7%
1953	3,522	+21.5%
1961	5,815	+65.1%
1971	15,683	+169.7%
1981	28,340	+80.7%
1991	35,337	+24.7%
2001	44,914	+27.1%
2011	54,085	+20.4%
2021	55,313	+2.3%
Source: Naselja i stanovništvo Republike Hrvatske 1857–2021, DZS

With a total population of 70,800 (as of 2021) it is the most populated district as well as the largest by area (165.3 km^{2}). According to the 2021 census, the settlement population is 55,313 and was 54,085 in 2011.

== Administrative division ==
The Sesvete district includes the following local government units - local committees (Croatian: mjesni odbori), some of which are also individual settlements:

- Adamovec
- Belovar
- Blaguša
- Budenec
- Cerje
- Dobrodol
- Dumovec
- Đurđekovec
- Gajec
- Gajišće
- Glavničica
- Glavnica Donja
- Glavnica Gornja
- Goranec
- Jelkovec
- Jesenovec
- Kašina
- Kašinska Sopnica
- Kobiljak
- Kraljevečki Novaki
- Kučilovina
- Luka
- Lužan
- Moravče
- Novo Brestje
- Paruževina
- Planina Donja
- Glanina Gornja
- Popovec
- Prekvršje
- Prepuštovec
- Sesvete
- Sesvetska Sela
- Sesvetska Selnica
- Sesvetska Sopnica
- Sesvetski Kraljevec
- Soblinec
- Staro Brestje
- Šašinovec
- Šimunčevec
- Vugrovec Donji
- Vugrovec Gornji
- Vurnovec
- Žerjavinec
