= Jarun =

Neighbourhood in Zagreb, Croatia

Lake Jarun
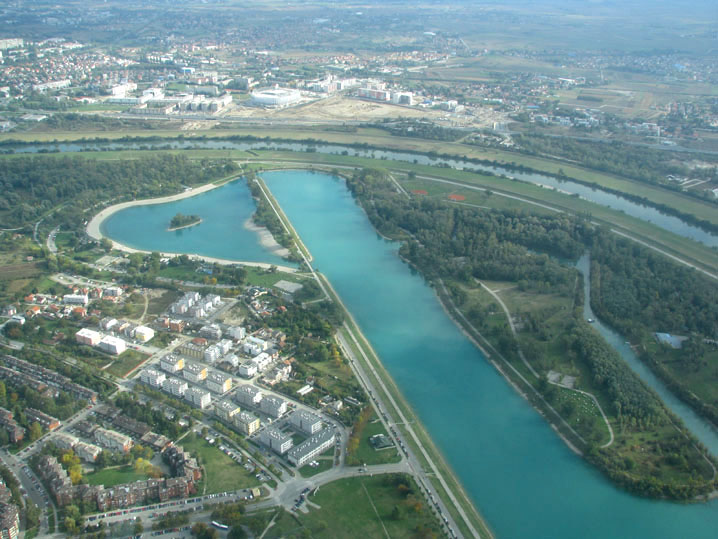

- Location within Croatia
- Interactive map of Lake Jarun
- Location: Zagreb
- Coordinates: 45°47′N 15°55′E
- Primary inflows: Sava
- Primary outflows: Sava
- Basin countries: Croatia
- Max. length: 2.25 km (1.40 mi)
- Settlements: Jarun

Jarun (pronounced [ˈjarun]) is a neighbourhood in the southwestern part of Zagreb, Croatia. It was named after Lake Jarun, formed by the Sava River, now located on the southern edge of the neighborhood.

== Lake ==
The lake is the location of the Jarun sports and leisure center, where people can row, paddle, sail, surf, swim, jog, bike, roller skate, and skateboard. Around the lake are many nightclubs and cafes such as Aquarius. Jarun Lake is currently a home of INmusic festival. Also, around the lake Jarun there is a "Walk of fame" with the pictures and biography information of great athletes of Croatian sport.

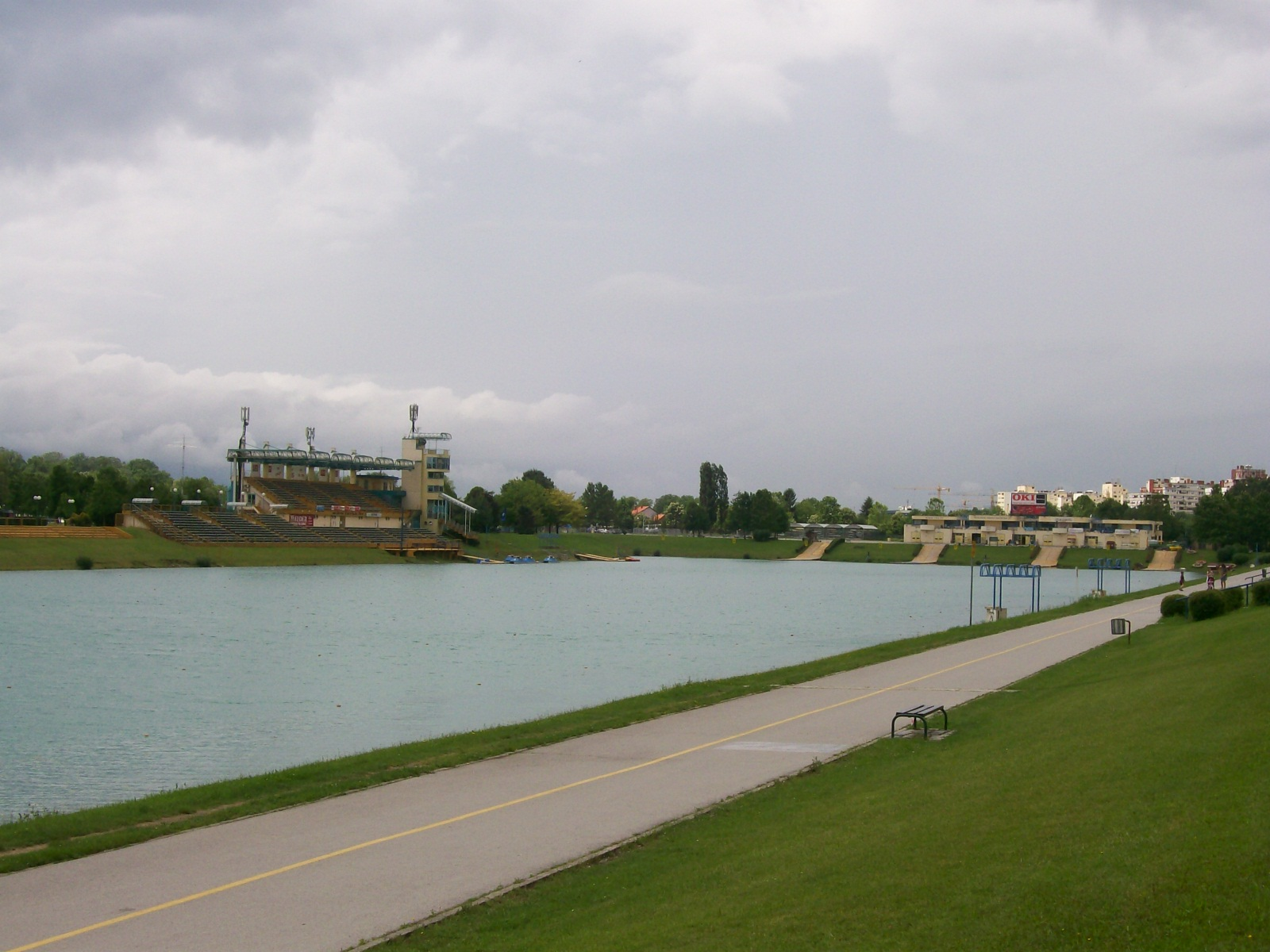
Western side of Lake Jarun, 2008.

== Neighborhood ==
The area covered by the local city council Jarun is 398.06 hectares, with 12,149 inhabitants (2011).

The development of Jarun began at the end of the 1970s when it was merely a village, with the building of apartment blocks. Development increased in 1987 due to the building of the sports and leisure center (for the Universiade in Zagreb). It is currently a middle-class neighborhood.

The borders of Jarun are Horvaćanska Street to the north with Staglišće, Hrvatski Sokol Street with Vrbani to the west, Vrapčak Creek with Gredice to the east, and the Sava River to the south. Jarun, in the wider sense, also includes the neighborhoods of Staglišće and Gredice.

== History ==
On the night of 10–11 March 2022, a Tupolev Tu-141 unmanned aerial vehicle crashed into Jarun, leaving behind a large crater. It flew through Hungarian airspace at an altitude of 1,300 metres (4,300 ft) and a speed of 700 kilometres per hour (430 mph). While the cause has yet to be confirmed as of 2024, it was speculated that the vehicle may have been being operated out of Yarun', which was confused with the graphically identical (in Cyrillic) Jarun, following which the wrong return coordinates were inputted.

== See also ==
- INmusic festival
- 1987 Summer Universiade
