= Prečko =

Neighbourhood in Zagreb, Croatia

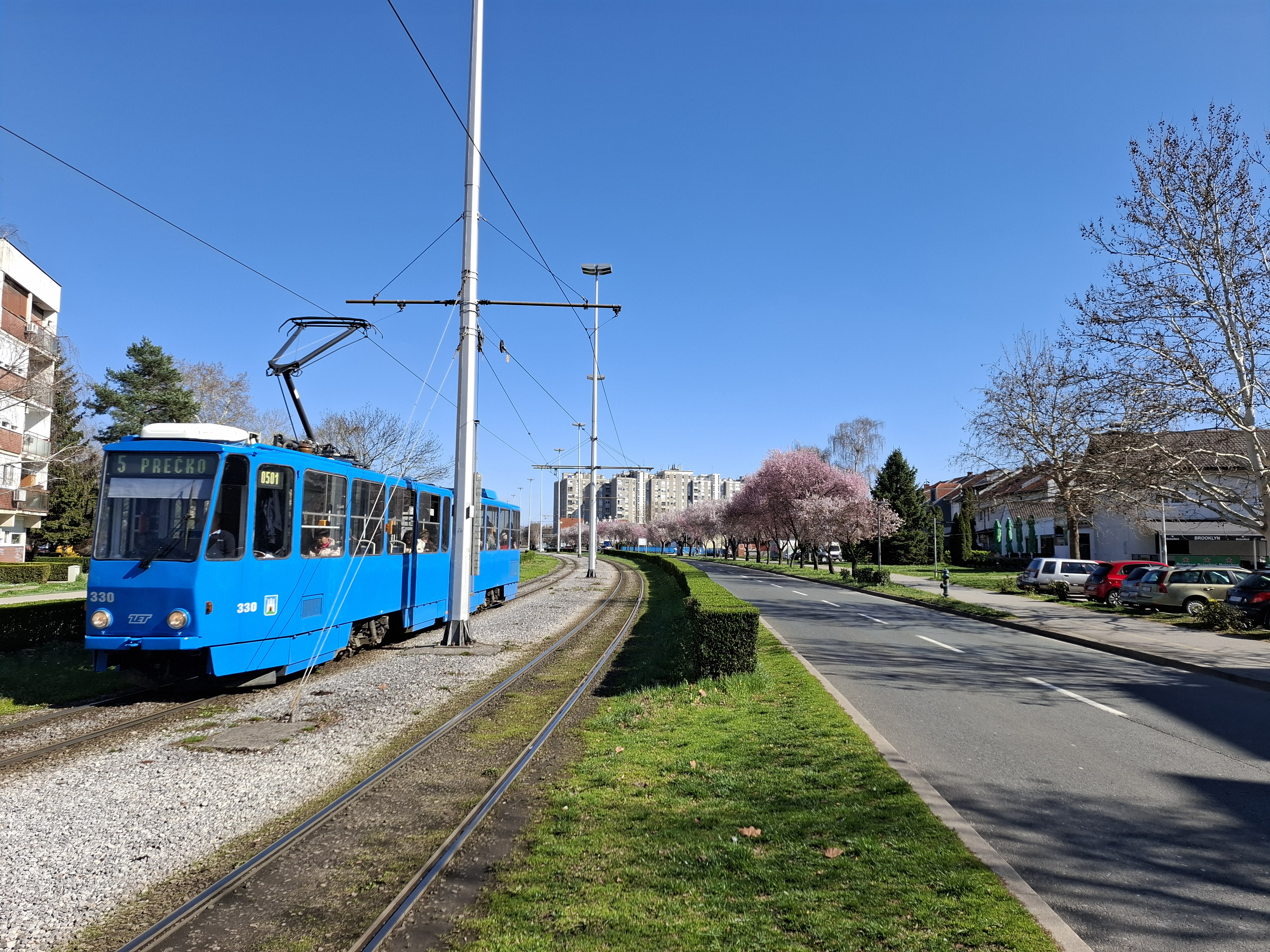
- Ivan Matetić Ronjgov Street, the central street in Prečko
- Interactive map of Prečko

Prečko is a neighbourhood in the southwest of Zagreb, Croatia, within the Trešnjevka – jug district. The area of the local city council of Prečko has a population of 13,795 (census 2021).

The former village of Prečko was first mentioned in the 18th century. In the 1950s, Prečko was part of the municipality of Vrapče, while in the 1960s it was part of Črnomerec. When the municipality of Trešnjevka was founded in 1974, Prečko was included in it.
