= Zagrebačka Avenue =

Coordinates: 45°47′38″N 15°56′19″E

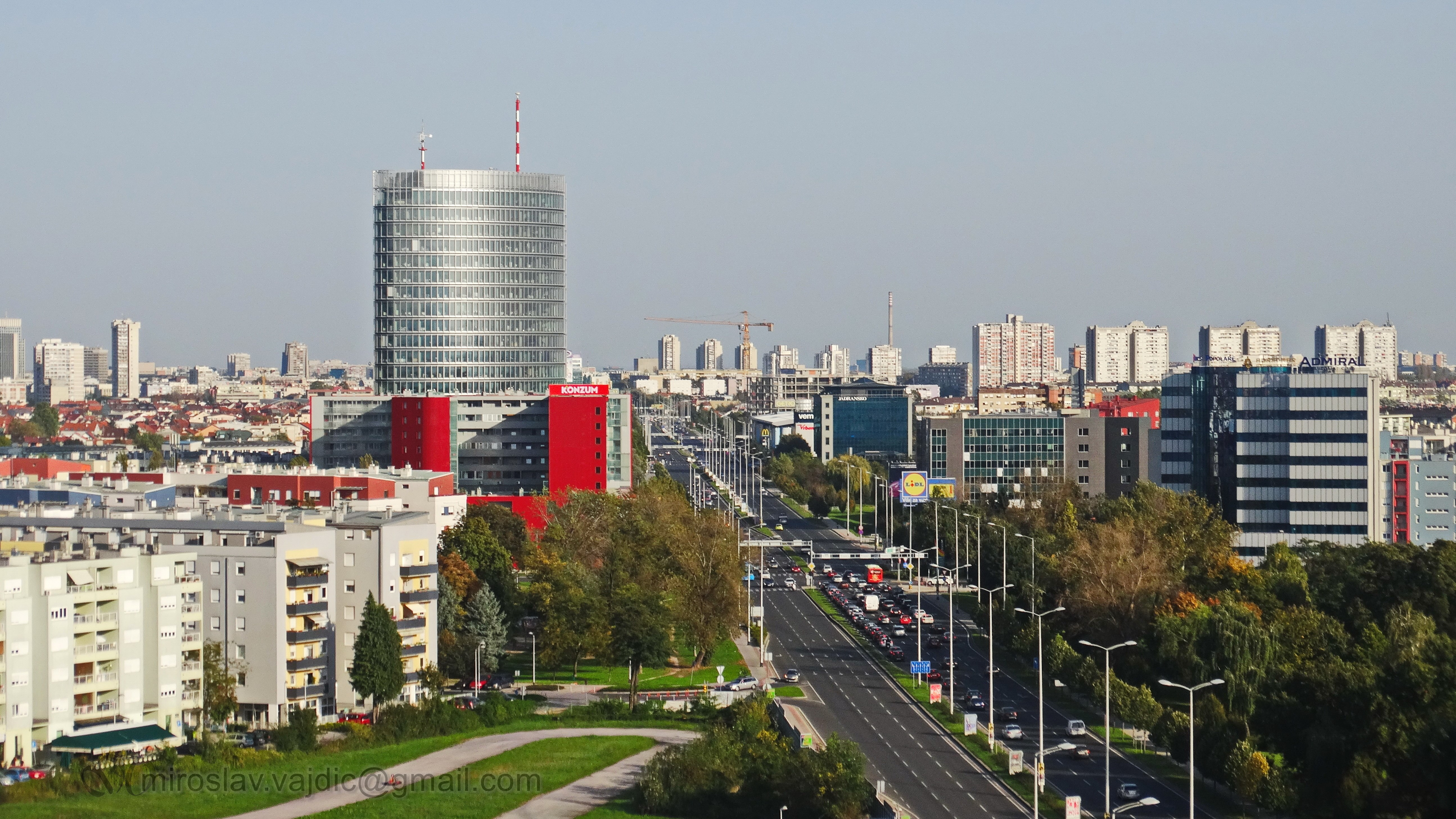
- Zagrebačka Avenue with Sky Office Tower, in Rudeš neighbourhood
- Interactive map of Zagrebačka Avenue

Zagrebačka Avenue (Croatian: Zagrebačka avenija) is an important east–west avenue in western Zagreb, Croatia. It is a dual carriageway with three lanes in each direction that starts as a continuation of the Slavonska Avenue under the intersection with the Savska Road, ending at the Savska Opatovina roundabout.

It was previously part of Ljubljanska Avenue, which used to span from the Jankomir interchange to Savska Road in the outer city center, but in 2006 a part of Ljubljanska Avenue was widened and separated from the old avenue to be named to Zagrebačka Avenue at the proposal of Mayor Milan Bandić. After the widening of the Savska Opatovina rotary (technically a roundabout interchange was added), none of the other intersections were converted to interchanges, for which Bandić was publicly criticized. as well as for making, by some accounts, an unnecessary and confusing name change for the street.
