= Rudeš =

Neighborhood in Zagreb, Croatia

Coordinates: 45°48′27″N 15°56′33″E

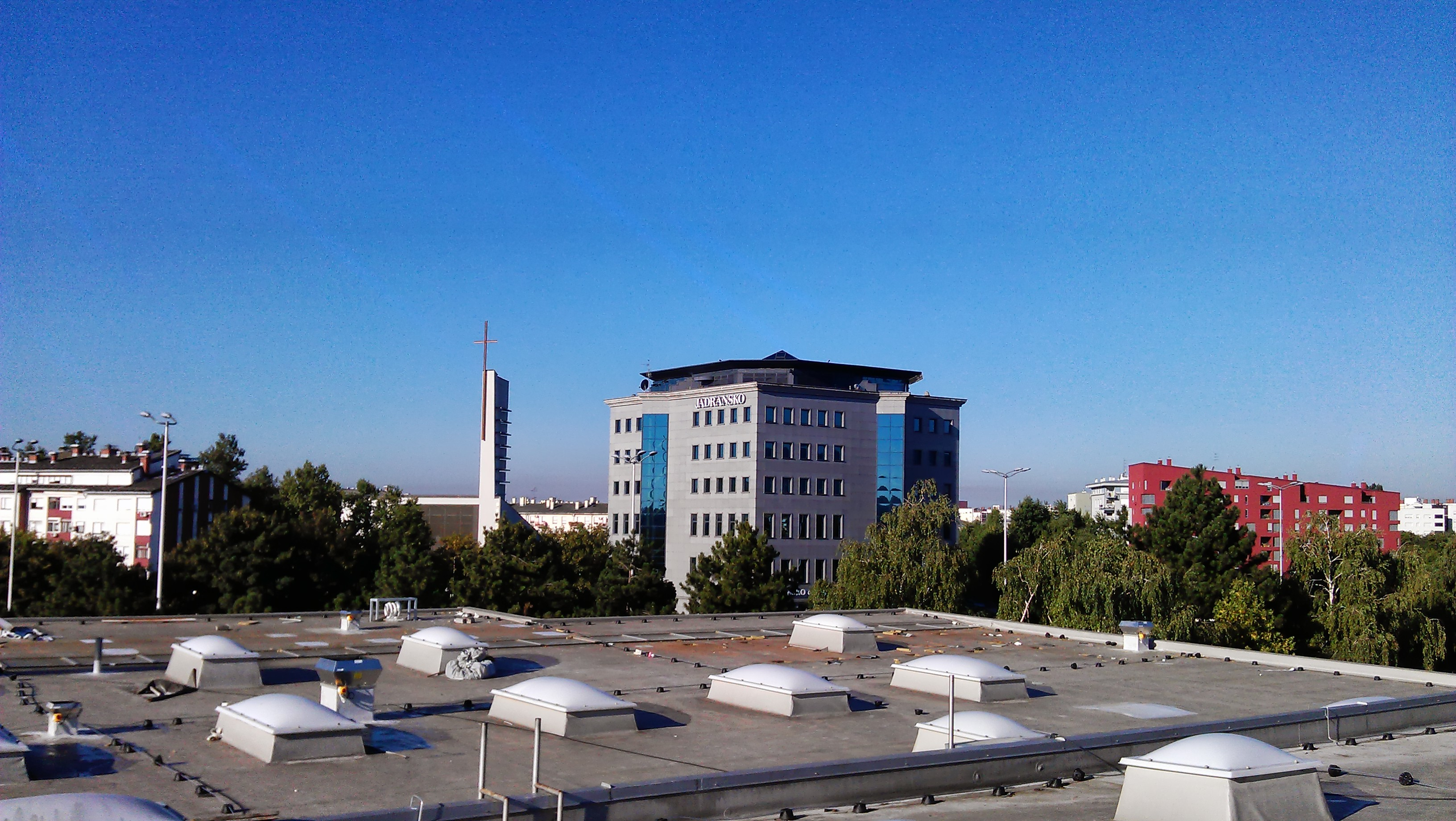
- Interactive map of Rudeš

Rudeš is a neighbourhood of Zagreb, Croatia, within the Trešnjevka – sjever district. The area covered by the local city council Rudeš has a population of 9,725 (2011).

In Rudeš, there is also an elementary school called "Elementary school Rudeš".

A soccer team in the first Croatian soccer league and from Rudeš is NK Rudeš.
