= Knežija =

Neighbourhood of Zagreb, Croatia

Coordinates: 45°47.4′N 15°57.1′E

- Interactive map of Knežija

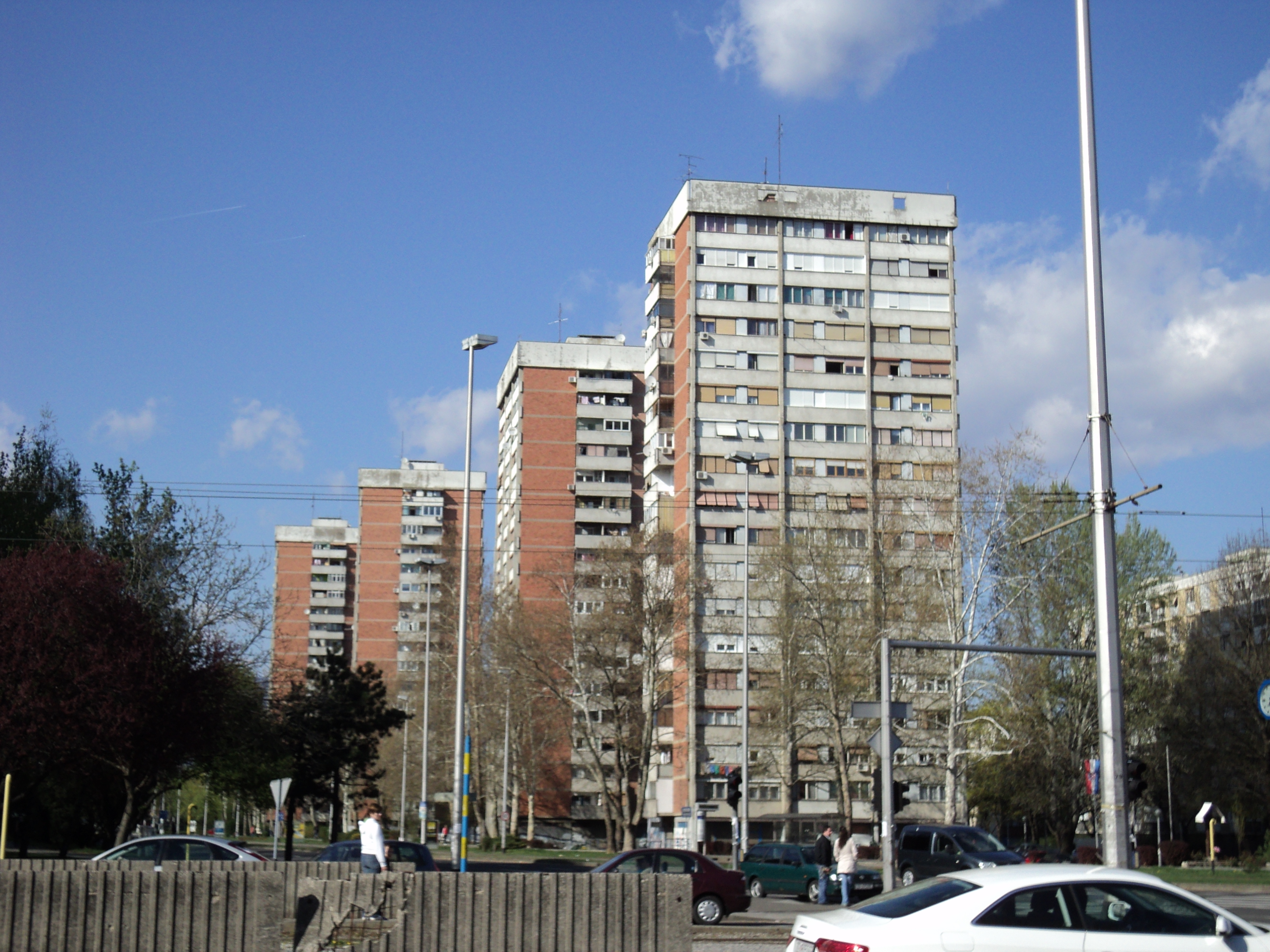
Buildings in Knežija

Knežija is a neighbourhood in the southwest of Zagreb, Croatia. It is one of the older parts of Trešnjevka. The area covered by the local city council Knežija has 9,877 inhabitants (census 2021).

The music ensemble Trešnjevka, headquartered in Knežija, has existed for more than 30 years, promoting the Croatian national, orchestral and vocal music and instrument called tambura.
