= Districts of Zagreb =

Zagreb is split into seventeen administrative divisions called city districts (Croatian: gradske četvrti). The city district, along with a local committee, is a form of local self-government in the City of Zagreb through which citizens participate in the decision-making process in self-governing areas of the City and local affairs that directly affect their lives. The city district is established for an area that represents urban, economic and social entity, which is linked to the common interests of citizens. The current division was established by the Statute of the City of Zagreb on 14 December 1999. Legally, a city district is a legal person who has its own governing bodies.

== List ==
Local committees of Zagreb, the second level of local self-government

List of districts by area and population in 2021.

#	District	Area (km^{2})	Population (2021)	Density
1	Donji grad (Lower town)	3.02	31,209	10,334
2	Gornji Grad–Medveščak (Upper town–Medveščak)	10.18	26,423	2,596
3	Trnje	7.36	40,539	5,508
4	Maksimir	14.97	47,356	3,163
5	Peščenica – Žitnjak	35.29	53,023	1,502
6	Novi Zagreb – istok (New Zagreb–East)	16.54	55,898	3,380
7	Novi Zagreb – zapad (New Zagreb–West)	62.63	63,917	1,021
8	Trešnjevka – sjever (Trešnjevka–North)	5.81	52,974	9,118
9	Trešnjevka – jug (Trešnjevka–South)	9.84	65,324	6,639
10	Črnomerec	24.16	38,084	1,576
11	Gornja Dubrava (Upper Dubrava)	40.43	58,255	1,441
12	Donja Dubrava (Lower Dubrava)	10.79	33,537	3,108
13	Stenjevec	12.24	53,862	4,400
14	Podsused – Vrapče	36.19	44,910	1,241
15	Podsljeme	59.25	18,974	320
16	Sesvete	165.22	70,800	429
17	Brezovica	127.32	12,046	95
	Total	641.24	767,131	1232

== Governance ==
Bodies that manage districts are the District Council and the President of the District Council.

=== District Council ===
District councils have between 11 and 19 members, depending on the number of inhabitants, namely:

- 11 members in the city district with up to 30 000 inhabitants (Brezovica, Podsljeme)
- 15 members in the city district with 30 000 to 50 000 inhabitants (Črnomerec, Donja Dubrava, Donji grad, Gornji grad - Medveščak, Maksimir, Novi Zagreb - Zapad, Podsused - Vrapče, Stenjevec, Trnje)
- 19 members in the city district with more than 50 000 inhabitants (Gornja Dubrava, Novi Zagreb - Istok, Peščenica - Žitnjak, Sesvete, Trešnjevka - sjever, Trešnjevka - jug)

Councillors are elected by the citizens who live in the district area at a general, free, secret and direct ballot every four years.

The Council autonomously issues the rules of the district, enacts the financial plan and final account, decides on the disposal of the districts property, introduces a plan of small communal actions (construction and maintenance of smaller communal infrastructure facilities and public buildings which improve the living standard of citizens) and determines the priority in their realization, elects its president and vice presidents, convenes the local meetings of the citizens, organizes and implements civil defense, coordinates the work of the local committees, issues its own work program and report, works with other city districts, cooperates with associations in its area, proposes the concept of development of its district within the Development plan of the City of Zagreb, proposes solutions for the problems in the procedures of drafting and issuing spatial and other planning documents and their realization in its area, monitors the status of district infrastructure and proposes programs for its development, cares for quality of housing, communal facilities and infrastructure, performs municipal and other service activities of significance for its district, takes care of the needs of the population in education, public health, social welfare, culture and sport, monitors measures and actions to protect and improve the environment and living conditions in the district, proposes measures for more efficient functioning of district services, proposes the establishment of institutions in the fields of care of preschool children, education, public health, social welfare, culture and sports, proposes the renaming of streets, public transport areas, parks, sports grounds, schools, kindergartens, cultural institutions and all other facilities in its district, may propose areas within its district in which local committees could be established, proposes change of area of the district or the local committees, and proposes the candidates for the jurors.

=== President of the District Council ===
President of the District Council is elected by members of the district council from among themselves by secret ballot for a four-year term.

The president represents the city district and the council, convenes council sessions, proposes councils' agenda, presides over council sessions, signs council acts, conducts and ensures implementation of council decisions, reports on council decisions, cooperates with the mayor and the president of the Zagreb Assembly, takes care of the implementation of the acts related to the work of the district, participates in the implementation of civil protection measures, informs the citizens about matters important to the district, and coordinates the work of the chairmen of local committees in the area of the district.

The president of the council is responsible to the mayor.
