= 2020 Zagreb flash flood =

Flood in Zagreb, Croatia

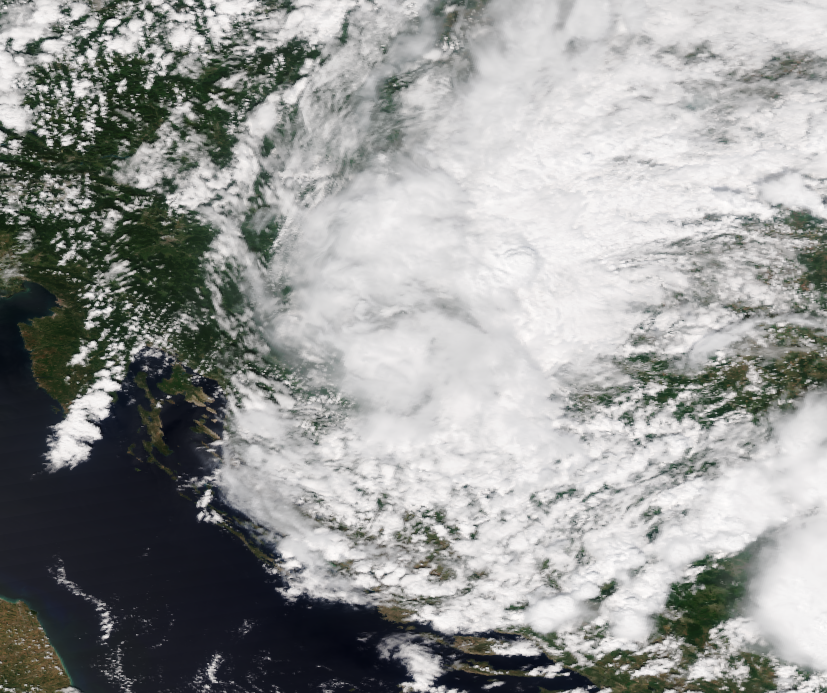
- Satellite picture of Croatia affected by the storm system of 24–25 July 2020
- Date: 24–25 July 2020
- Location: Zagreb, Croatia
- Cause: Heavy rain, combined sewer system failure
- Deaths: 1

On the night of 24–25 July 2020, after 21:00 local time (CEST, 19:00 UTC), Zagreb, Croatia, was struck by a storm which produced one of the worst flash floods in the city's history. An episode of intense rainfall dumped more than 50 millimetres (2 in) of rain within two hours. The torrential streams of the mountain overlying Zagreb surged and overwhelmed the city's combined sewer system, causing flooding. The effects were worst felt in the inner city, notably Ilica, Donji grad, and Trnje, though many suburbs were also affected, including Buzin, Črnomerec, Jankomir, and Maksimir. Public transport and automobile traffic ceased in many streets, while trapped people had to be rescued from flooded cars and apartments. A firefighter died at an intervention. No financial estimate of damage was released by the authorities. The city government reported receiving over 2,000 damage claims during an eight-day filing period.

Zagreb lies on the foothills of Medvednica mountain, with the inner city squeezed on a floodplain between the mountain and the River Sava. Both the mountain streams and the river have produced deadly floods in the past. A system of flood defences has since been created to prevent flooding, and is under the jurisdiction of the state water management company, Hrvatske vode. However, in spite of flash flood hazard warnings issued by Croatian and international agencies in the preceding 48 hours, the flood defences were not activated. A group of Trnje residents broke into the empty building of the Kuniščak dam, which functions as the outlet to many of the torrential streams, and opened the dam to drain the flood waters from the city. In the following days, a controversy ensued about who was responsible for the dam being closed, and its control building locked and unstaffed. Hrvatske vode, the mayor, and the city's water and sewer utility company all denied responsibility for the flood and faced criticism from the public. Additionally, a local man broke in and operated the dam controls was arrested by the police in an incident described by some as a case of police brutality, prompting a public outcry. Hrvatske vode filed a police complaint for breaking and entering against the group of residents. The man was exonerated of all charges in May 2021.

== Background ==
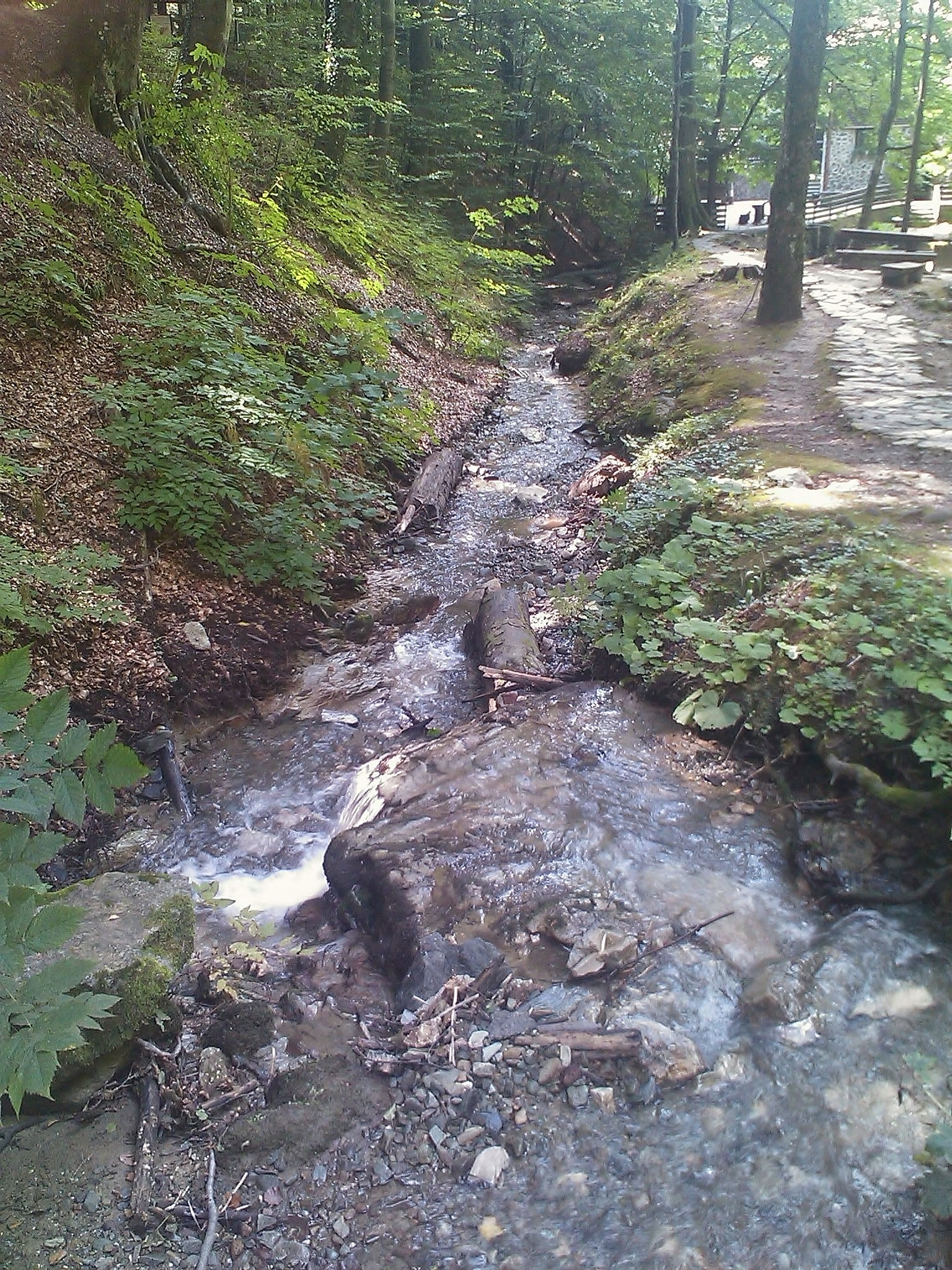
Medveščak stream near its source at Kraljičin zdenac

Zagreb faces flooding hazard from two sources: the River Sava, which caused the devastating flood of 1964; and the so-called Zagreb streams of Medvednica Mountain, on whose southern side the city lies. There are several dozen streams on the Zagreb-facing side of Medvednica. They are known for torrential flow during rainstorms. A particularly violent flash flood occurred in July 1651, when the Medveščak stream overflowed during a night-time storm, washing away numerous houses and trees in Potok Street and causing 52 deaths. Flood defences were built around Medveščak as early as the 17th century. The last major flooding event in the city was the overflowing of Zagreb streams during record rains of 3–4 July 1989, causing flooding in the area from the Zagreb Zoo in Maksimir Street to Žitnjak, which prompted the construction of retentions and sluices to control the drainage of storm waters from Medvednica foothills, as well as channelling and covering of Zagreb streams. As of 2004, 19 out of planned 39 retentions had been built. No new retentions have been constructed since. Risk of flooding from Zagreb streams is exacerbated by the city's geography. The terrain transitions abruptly from hills to impermeable highly urbanised river lowland, occasionally overwhelming the sewer system during heavy rainfall events.

On 23 July at 02:00 CEST the European Flood Awareness System issued a flood warning for Central Croatia. The Croatian Meteorological and Hydrological Service (Croatian: Državni hidrometeorološki zavod, DHMZ) had issued a red Meteoalarm thunderstorm warning, the highest level, for 24 July in Central Croatia, specifying a danger of flash flooding and power failures, and expected rainfall over 50 mm (2.0 in). The European Storm Forecast Experiment issued a Level 2 alert for an area including Zagreb, warning of possibilities of large hail, severe wind gusts and tornadoes, and noting that "an excessive rainfall risk could arise over parts of Slovenia and Croatia during the overnight hours."

== Meteorological history ==
An upper-level trough with cool air was approaching Croatia from the Alps in the west, meeting humid air arriving from the sea in the southwest. Together with orographic lift stemming from coastal Dinaric Alps, this created conditions highly conducive to forming strong thunderstorms, signalled by high convective available potential energy (CAPE) and deep layer wind shear of 10–20 m/s (20–40 kn). Severe thunderstorms first developed during the night of 23–24 July over northern Italy. By mid-day, storms began forming over Croatia. Hail was recorded in Istria, and in the afternoon a flash flood struck Senj, a coastal city south of Zagreb. Storms also caused damage in Bosnia and Herzegovina, with flash flooding and high winds recorded in Tuzla.

The storm cell which caused flooding formed southwest of the city around 21:00 CEST. As the trough turned into a low, the storm system stalled over Zagreb around 21:45, causing heavy rainfall and a high incidence of lightning. The storm dropped unusually high amounts of rain over a short period of time. The Zagreb-Grič meteorological station, which has kept hourly rainfall records since 1910, measured a record-breaking 58.9 millimetres (2.32 in) of rain in the one-hour period from 21:00 to 22:00 and a total of 77.0 mm (3.03 in) from 21:00 to 23:00, the latter occurrence having a return period of over 400 years. The Zagreb-Maksimir station measured 51.5 mm (2.03 in) in the same time period, an amount with a 76-year return period. The 24-hour totals were 89 mm (3.5 in) for Grič, 70 mm (2.8 in) for Mt Sljeme, Medvednica's peak, and 65 mm (2.6 in) for Maksimir, in places higher than the average for the entire month of July, but fell short of the rainfall of the 1989 flash flood and the 24-hour rainfall records established in 1926. In an average year, the rainiest day sees 47.6 mm (1.87 in) of precipitation.

== Flooding ==
External videos
- Videos of flooding in Zagreb, collected and published by 24 sata (Croatia).

The rainfall quickly caused torrential flow in the Zagreb streams. Water level of the Štefanovec stream rose nearly sixfold in a short period of time. According to the DHMZ, overflowing of streams was avoided due to summer low water levels and the precipitation being concentrated on Zagreb city centre, but the high amount of inflowing water strained the mixed sewage–stormwater drain system in the inner city, causing flooding in substantial areas of Zagreb. The flooding was worst in the city centre, which lies south of the transition to lowlands, on the River Sava floodplain which is protected from river waters by embankments. Water interrupted tram traffic and rendered major streets and underpasses impassable, while the failure of the sewer system caused water to back into homes and buildings.

Areas affected by flooding included Ilica street, British Square, Donji grad district, Trnje, Stara Trešnjevka, Rudeš, Jazbina, Črnomerec neighbourhood of Šestinski dol Jankomir, and Buzin. In Črnomerec, Fraterščica Road was closed due to water damage, while drivers had to be helped out of stranded cars in numerous places. Torrential flow blocked the Črnomerec stream culvert at Črnomerec Road, later causing flooding during another hailstorm on 26 July.

In the low-lying district of Trnje, local residents reported that the flood arrived after 22:00, blowing out manhole covers before entering homes. The water accumulated until some of the residents broke into the empty, flooded control room of the Kuniščak dam and managed to open the sluice gate, after which the water level in the neighbourhood receded. According to the residents, the flood tripped the building's residual-current device, so one of them manually operated the control valve. The Kuniščak dam on the Sava's left embankment is part of Zagreb metropolitan area's flood defence system. The dam controls water flow between Sava and many Zagreb streams whose natural mouths have been blocked and flows re-routed to prevent backward flow at high Sava water levels. The dam is managed by Hrvatske vode, who could not be reached during the emergency according to the residents. According to Vodoopskrba i odvodnja (ViO), Zagreb's public water and sewer utility company, the flooding was additionally exacerbated because all 19 retentions on Zagreb streams were left opened. The retentions are intended to be closed when flooding is likely, in order to retard the water flow, thus preventing flash floods downstream.

The flood claimed a single indirect fatality, a volunteer firefighter who died while responding to an emergency. Among the injured was a disabled man who was helped out of his car by a passerby after his car was dragged by the torrent into an underpass under 2.5 metres (8 ft) of water. There were several thousand calls to emergency services. Around 23:00, Zagreb Fire Department requested that citizens not call them except in cases of extreme urgency. There were around 50 ambulance interventions.

== Kuniščak dam ==
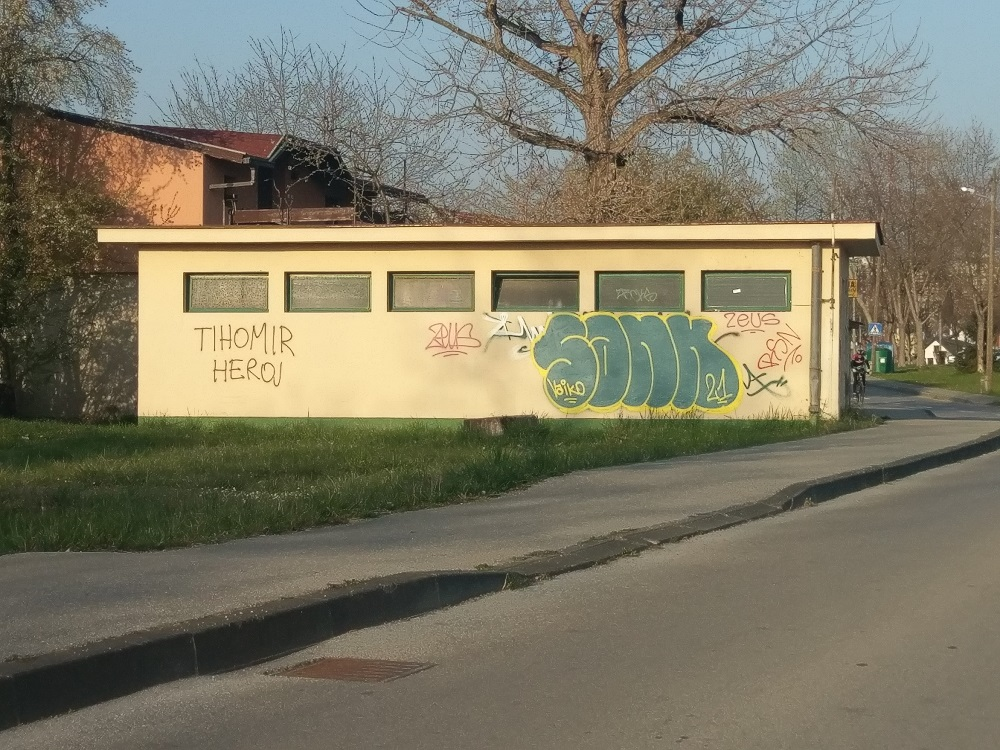
The Kuniščak dam control building

External videos
- Water flowing through Kuniščak dam two hours after the dam was opened, by unnamed Trnje resident, published by 24 sata (Croatia).

The closed sluice gate quickly became a point of controversy. Both the City of Zagreb and Hrvatske vode, the state company responsible for flood protection, disavowed responsibility for the inactivated flood defences. On 26 July, Hrvatske vode held a press conference at the Kuniščak dam, denying responsibility for the flood. The representatives cited lack of urgency due to low water in Sava, at 161 cm (5 ft 3 in) below the zero level, as the reason for not staffing the dam. They were heckled by assembled residents. The following day, Hrvatske vode stated on the Otvoreno talk show that the sluice gate was closed to avoid river water backing into the city, and because all wastewater was intended for the wastewater treatment plant at the main wastewater canal (Gradski odvodni kanal, GOK), which also has an outlet into Sava, downriver from Zagreb. The ViO director credited a new interceptor sewer in eastern Zagreb with saving the neighbourhoods of Trnava and Sesvete, which are not connected to the treatment plant. Hrvatske vode later stated that it had been ViO's responsibility to staff the dam, and that flash flooding is not their area of responsibility.

During a storm on 3 August, the sluice gate was staffed by Hrvatske vode due to "expected water level rises in ephemeral water courses", and was opened to prevent flooding. In response to a subsequent media inquiry, Hrvatske vode stated that they would have opened the gate during the flash flood, had they received such a request from ViO. The official of Hrvatske vode responsible for flood control in the upper course of Sava was removed from his position as a result of the controversy.

=== Arrest ===
Tihomir Blagus, the Trnje resident who operated the sluice gate was arrested by the police the day after the storm. He had returned to the dam control shed, where he encountered and engaged in conversation with several police officers who were investigating the break-in, confessing to them his actions of the previous night. He was released from custody the same day, allegedly due to public pressure. According to Blagus, he was tackled and arrested after asking for his mobile phone back, after he tried to film the conversation with his phone and a policeman knocked it out of his hands. According to a statement by the police, he was under the influence of alcohol, yelled and made gestures at the officers, and refused to cease this behaviour. The police statement described the cause of arrest as breach of peace, not the control building break-in. A video of Blagus' arrest was published on Facebook, showing an officer applying pressure on the man's neck with his knee. The police said that the footage is incomplete and taken out of context. Police did not take disciplinary action against the involved officers, stating that the method of applying shin pressure on the arrestee's neck was legal, while former Croatian interior minister Ranko Ostojić said the method had been banned several years earlier.

The manner of the arrest gave way to accusations of police brutality, and sparked a discussion on whether citizens are allowed to film police officers on duty. Attorneys consulted by the Jutarnji list newspaper and RTL television network stated that citizens are within their rights to film police officers in similar situations. Ombudswoman of Croatia Lora Vidović announced her office was investigating the incident, but declined to comment on the legality of the arrest. Social and news media condemned the use of force and hailed Blagus as the "hero who saved Trnje" for his actions during the flood. An online petition was started in his support.

External videos
- Recording of Trnje resident's arrest by a bystander, published by Večernji list
- Video taken by Trnje resident before his arrest, published by Net.hr.

Hrvatske vode reported the control building break-in to the police, and in September charges were filed against Blagus for breach of peace and disrespecting an officer of the law. While Hrvatske vode stated they attempted to retract the break-in complaint. In Croatian law, breaking and entering is punishable by a fine or a jail sentence up to one year. Court cases against some of the residents who broke in were still ongoing as of December 2020; in May 2021, however, Blagus was found not guilty.

In Blagus' home, the flood destroyed furniture, appliances, flooring and most of his possessions, including his car. Trnje residents stated they had to wash away accumulated mud from their streets on their own, as city services did not arrive to clean the streets for several days. Blagus was allegedly offered a compensation of 2,500 Croatian kuna (€330) by Mayor Milan Bandić through the neighbourhood council, an offer described as "generous" by the message, which he declined. His employer donated 43,000 kuna (€5,600) worth of furniture to his household. Blagus said that the city estimated the damage at 100,000 kuna (€13,000).

== Damage ==
Numerous households were inundated by storm waters and backed up sewage. Zagreb Fire Department conducted several hundred interventions, mainly pumping out water from homes, and rescuing people from stranded cars, and basement and ground floor apartments. The flood caused further damage to some of the buildings already damaged in the earthquake four months earlier. Among those were the Children's Hospital Zagreb in Klaić Street, where the flood destroyed the hospital pharmacy and medical equipment, including the hospital's supply of artificial skin, the University of Zagreb Faculty of Science administrative building, and a number of public libraries. Initial estimates put the damage in the children's hospital at 1–1.5 million kuna (€130,000–€200,000) not including furniture and computer equipment. Equipment was lent from other hospitals. Hospital workers spent the night of the flood pumping and bailing out water which reached a height of 60 cm (2 ft). Other buildings with significant flood damage included the Museum of Arts and Crafts and Importanne Centar shopping mall, the recently opened Backo Mini Express model train museum, and University of Zagreb's Faculty of Food Technology and Biotechnology.

As of September 2020, Zagreb city government had not released information about the extent of the damage. On 26 July, the Ministry of Regional Development and EU Funds considered requesting financial assistance for flood damage from the EU; there were no further announcements on this matter.

== Response ==
President Zoran Milanović, Prime Minister Andrej Plenković and Mayor Milan Bandić expressed their condolences for the deceased firefighter and his family. Mayor Bandić said the city would help with flood damage, but denied local government's responsibility for the damage. He said that damage was "minimal", the "cause was chiefly do-it-yourself [construction]", and the flood would have been "forgotten in 24 hours" if it were not for the deceased firefighter. These comments were criticised by the opposition and by residents affected by the floods. The residents and neighbourhood councils were initially given less than two days to file damage claims and have them relayed to the city government. The deadline was later extended by one week after requests from opposition parties. The city government reported receiving 2,277 damage claims, of which 1,738 were accepted. Mayor Bandić stated that the flood did not fulfill the requirements for proclaiming a state of natural disaster because it caused less than 1 billion kuna (€130 million) in damage. Although Bandić initially promised compensation of up to 50,000 kuna (€6,600) or accommodation in public housing, in February 2021, the City requested further documentation for the claims, and announced that uninsured flood victim households would receive lump sum payments of 3,000 to 12,000 kuna (€400–1,580) as compensation.

News reports covered the poor shape of storm drains in Zagreb, the maintenance of which had ceased after the earthquake, according to ViO director. ViO and the city also received criticism for poor sewerage design from residents of a number of flooded neighbourhoods, citing recurring flooding issues that started after sewer or road works. Residents of Jazbina street blamed the city's 2011 street reconstruction, which re-routed storm runoff around the 614 m (2,014 ft) long Jazbina retention, for recurrent flooding at heavy rainfall. Newspapers questioned why the city of Varaždin, 60 kilometres (37 mi) north of Zagreb, saw more rainfall from the same storm system (128 mm, 5.04 in), yet did not experience significant flooding as in Zagreb. An expert credited lower intensity of rainfall in Varaždin, different terrain, and better sewerage maintenance.

On 28 July, Mayor Bandić announced the city would sue Hrvatske vode for "stealing 450 million kuna [€60 million] in utility charges" from Zagreb residents. Opposition politicians criticised Bandić's response, blaming the disaster on a lack of communication between the City and Hrvatske vode, and a long-term state of disrepair of utility services in Zagreb, citing frequent water and district heating outages, open sewers near the city centre, and sinkholes opening up on street surfaces.

== Future ==
ViO announced a 2 billion kuna (€260 million) project, and plans to retrofit Zagreb's stormwater drain system to prevent such floods in the future, though "warning" that it would not be possible without cooperation with Hrvatske vode. The plans would involve replacement of aged pipes and adding computer-controlled valves and sensors. ViO announced a plan to transfer the Kuniščak dam under its own responsibility and outfit it with a remote control system. Zagreb's sewers date back to 1892, and inner city drains transport both sewage and storm waters. According to ViO, the day's rainfall was three times more than the sewers can handle. The DHMZ said that such heavy rainfall events will become more common and more extreme in the future due to climate change. As in many other large cities, the risk and severity of urban flooding has also increased due to the urban area expanding and taking over previously permeable ground. Over the preceding 15 years, ViO and its parent company, Zagreb Holding, had raised several hundred million euro through bonds for improvements to Zagreb's water and sewerage network, but nearly all of the money was spent on other purposes, including real estate deals.

Together with the COVID-19 pandemic and the earthquake, the flood contributed to the growth in the number of homeless people in Zagreb in 2020.

The flood was also commemorated in art. Filip Šovagović and Dubravko Mihanović wrote Zagreb 2020, a play about the calamities which struck the city in 2020, including the flood. The play premiered on 27 November 2020 at the Lauba House, and is as of June 2021 performed at other venues by the staff of Gavella Drama Theatre, whose building awaits earthquake damage repairs. Performance artist Aleksandar Battista Ilić hung large red crosses made of canvas on several damaged buildings in Ilica street as part of the Project Ilica: Q'Art community art event.

== See also ==
- 1964 Zagreb flood
- List of flash floods
- List of floods in Europe
