= Kustošija =

Neighbourhood of Zagreb, Croatia

Kustošija is a neighborhood of a city district Črnomerec in Zagreb, Croatia. It has a brook named Kustošak running through it, and also a park-forest Grmoščica, and a border of the nature park Medvednica runs along the northern inhabited part. Kustošija has one nursery and two elementary schools.

== History ==
Kustošija is one of the oldest neighborhoods in the vicinity of Zagreb, with notable records from the early Modern Age. Kustošija was not a part of Zagreb until 1945., and became so as part of the annexation of the district of Vrapče. In the year 1932., the press covered the annexation thoroughly. Some people were against the annexation, as they believed the city would only be burdened by it, due to the much needed investments for road-planning, sewer, train, and water coverage etc. On the other hand, Kustošija has promoted the annexation, motivated by the gains for the city's industry, which was mainly located in the outskirts of the city.

=== Church ===
On 29 June 1939, during the feast of St. Peter and Paul, in the presence of Archbishop Stepinac, a parish is officially established, bearing the name of St. Nikola Tavelić. The church was sanctified 14 November 1943 by Archbishop Stepinac.

=== Name ===
Kustošija was a part of Kaptol, and was named after the "canon curator" who took care of the area.

=== Population ===
Kustošija itself had 4,277 citizens when the railroad was made. According to the Population Census of 2011, Kustošija had a population of 14,040, and spanned across 613.36 hectares (1,515.6 acres).

=== Football Team ===
It is also the namesake of 'NK Kustošija', which is a Croatian football club based in Zagreb.

== See also ==
- Zagreb
- Kustošak
- NK Kustošija Zagreb
