= List of streams of Zagreb =

List of streams of Zagreb contains streams which flow in or near Zagreb.

- Krapina
- Gradna
- Rakovica
- Konščica
- Lomnica
- Kukeljnjak
- Lipnica
- Peščenjak
- Šiljak
- Bunica
- Rečica
- Curek
- Kosnica
- Koravec
- Buna
- Lonja
- Črnec
- Zelina
- Čučerska Reka
- Kašina
- Glavničica
- Nespeš
- Starča
- Kutnici
- Bidrovec
- Blicanec
- Medveščak
- Kustošak
- Vuger
- Bliznec
- Črnomerec
- Dolje
- Dubravica
- Gračec
- Kraljevec
- Kuniščak
- Trnava
- Vrapčak

== By watershed ==
- Krapina
  - ...
  - Ivanšćak (3.3 kilometres (2.1 mi)), a sinking stream
  - Mali Jarak Ivanečki (2.1 kilometres (1.3 mi))
  - Veliki Jarak Ivanečki (2.5 kilometres (1.6 mi))
  - Kučerski Jarak (1.3 kilometres (0.81 mi))
  - Šumešćak (940 metres (3,080 ft))
  - Repinjak (1.1 kilometres (0.68 mi))
  - Maglinjak (460 metres (1,510 ft))
- Sava
  - Jagodišćak Levi† (250 metres (820 ft))
  - ...

== Bibliography ==
- DGU (1960a). Hrvatska osnovna karta u mjerilu 1:5000 (Map) (in Serbo-Croatian). § Zagreb: 5 J 22 - 42.
- DGU (1960b). Hrvatska osnovna karta u mjerilu 1:5000 (Map) (in Serbo-Croatian). § Zagreb: 5 J 22 - 43.
- DGU (1960c). Hrvatska osnovna karta u mjerilu 1:5000 (Map) (in Serbo-Croatian). § Zagreb: 5 J 22 - 44.
- DGU (1960d). Hrvatska osnovna karta u mjerilu 1:5000 (Map) (in Serbo-Croatian). § Zagreb: 5 J 22 - 45.
- DGU (1960e). Hrvatska osnovna karta u mjerilu 1:5000 (Map) (in Serbo-Croatian). § Zagreb: 5 J 22 - 46.
- DGU (1961a). Hrvatska osnovna karta u mjerilu 1:5000 (Map) (in Serbo-Croatian). § Zagreb: 5 J 22 - 47.
- DGU (1961b). Hrvatska osnovna karta u mjerilu 1:5000 (Map) (in Serbo-Croatian). § Zagreb: 5 J 22 - 48.
- DGU (1961c). Hrvatska osnovna karta u mjerilu 1:5000 (Map) (in Serbo-Croatian). § Dugo Selo: 5 K 22 - 33.
- DGU (1961d). Hrvatska osnovna karta u mjerilu 1:5000 (Map) (in Serbo-Croatian). § Dugo Selo: 5 K 22 - 34.
- DGU (1961e). Hrvatska osnovna karta u mjerilu 1:5000 (Map) (in Serbo-Croatian). § Dugo Selo: 5 K 22 - 35.
- DGU (1961f). Hrvatska osnovna karta u mjerilu 1:5000 (Map) (in Serbo-Croatian). § Dugo Selo: 5 K 22 - 41.
- DGU (1961g). Hrvatska osnovna karta u mjerilu 1:5000 (Map) (in Serbo-Croatian). § Dugo Selo: 5 K 22 - 42.
- DGU (1961h). Hrvatska osnovna karta u mjerilu 1:5000 (Map) (in Serbo-Croatian). § Dugo Selo: 5 K 22 - 43.
- DGU (1961i). Hrvatska osnovna karta u mjerilu 1:5000 (Map) (in Serbo-Croatian). § Dugo Selo: 5 K 22 - 44.
- DGU (1961j). Hrvatska osnovna karta u mjerilu 1:5000 (Map) (in Serbo-Croatian). § Dugo Selo: 5 K 22 - 45.
- DGU (1961k). Hrvatska osnovna karta u mjerilu 1:5000 (Map) (in Serbo-Croatian). § Dugo Selo: 5 K 22 - 46.
- DGU (1961l). Hrvatska osnovna karta u mjerilu 1:5000 (Map) (in Serbo-Croatian). § Ivanić Grad: 5 K 21 - 45.
- DGU (1961m). Hrvatska osnovna karta u mjerilu 1:5000 (Map) (in Serbo-Croatian). § Ivanić Grad: 5 K 21 - 46.
- DGU (1962). Hrvatska osnovna karta u mjerilu 1:5000 (Map) (in Serbo-Croatian). § Ivanić Grad: 5 K 21 - 39.
- DGU (1963a). Hrvatska osnovna karta u mjerilu 1:5000 (Map) (in Serbo-Croatian). § Zagreb: 5 J 22 - 21.
- DGU (1963b). Hrvatska osnovna karta u mjerilu 1:5000 (Map) (in Serbo-Croatian). § Zagreb: 5 J 22 - 23.
- DGU (1963c). Hrvatska osnovna karta u mjerilu 1:5000 (Map) (in Serbo-Croatian). § Zagreb: 5 J 22 - 24.
- DGU (1963d). Hrvatska osnovna karta u mjerilu 1:5000 (Map) (in Serbo-Croatian). § Zagreb: 5 J 22 - 25.
- DGU (1963e). Hrvatska osnovna karta u mjerilu 1:5000 (Map) (in Serbo-Croatian). § Zagreb: 5 J 22 - 26.
- DGU (1963f). Hrvatska osnovna karta u mjerilu 1:5000 (Map) (in Serbo-Croatian). § Zagreb: 5 J 22 - 27.
- DGU (1963g). Hrvatska osnovna karta u mjerilu 1:5000 (Map) (in Serbo-Croatian). § Zagreb: 5 J 22 - 31.
- DGU (1963h). Hrvatska osnovna karta u mjerilu 1:5000 (Map) (in Serbo-Croatian). § Zagreb: 5 J 22 - 32.
- DGU (1963i). Hrvatska osnovna karta u mjerilu 1:5000 (Map) (in Serbo-Croatian). § Zagreb: 5 J 22 - 33.
- DGU (1963j). Hrvatska osnovna karta u mjerilu 1:5000 (Map) (in Serbo-Croatian). § Zagreb: 5 J 22 - 34.
- DGU (1963k). Hrvatska osnovna karta u mjerilu 1:5000 (Map) (in Serbo-Croatian). § Zagreb: 5 J 22 - 35.
- DGU (1963l). Hrvatska osnovna karta u mjerilu 1:5000 (Map) (in Serbo-Croatian). § Zagreb: 5 J 22 - 36.
- DGU (1963m). Hrvatska osnovna karta u mjerilu 1:5000 (Map) (in Serbo-Croatian). § Zagreb: 5 J 22 - 37.
- DGU (1963n). Hrvatska osnovna karta u mjerilu 1:5000 (Map) (in Serbo-Croatian). § Samobor: 5 I 22 - 40.
- DGU (1964). Hrvatska osnovna karta u mjerilu 1:5000 (Map) (in Serbo-Croatian). § Zagreb: 5 J 22 - 41.
- DGU (1965a). Hrvatska osnovna karta u mjerilu 1:5000 (Map) (in Serbo-Croatian). § Donja Stubica: 5 J 23 - 47.
- DGU (1965b). Hrvatska osnovna karta u mjerilu 1:5000 (Map) (in Serbo-Croatian). § Samobor: 5 I 22 - 19.
- DGU (1965c). Hrvatska osnovna karta u mjerilu 1:5000 (Map) (in Serbo-Croatian). § Samobor: 5 I 22 - 29.
- DGU (1965d). Hrvatska osnovna karta u mjerilu 1:5000 (Map) (in Serbo-Croatian). § Samobor: 5 I 22 - 39.
- DGU (1965e). Hrvatska osnovna karta u mjerilu 1:5000 (Map) (in Serbo-Croatian). § Samobor: 5 I 22 - 50.
- DGU (1965f). Hrvatska osnovna karta u mjerilu 1:5000 (Map) (in Serbo-Croatian). § Velika Gorica: 5 J 21 - 6.
- DGU (1965g). Hrvatska osnovna karta u mjerilu 1:5000 (Map) (in Serbo-Croatian). § Velika Gorica: 5 J 21 - 7.
- DGU (1965h). Hrvatska osnovna karta u mjerilu 1:5000 (Map) (in Serbo-Croatian). § Velika Gorica: 5 J 21 - 10.
- DGU (1965i). Hrvatska osnovna karta u mjerilu 1:5000 (Map) (in Serbo-Croatian). § Zagreb: 5 J 22 - 6.
- DGU (1965j). Hrvatska osnovna karta u mjerilu 1:5000 (Map) (in Serbo-Croatian). § Zagreb: 5 J 22 - 7.
- DGU (1965k). Hrvatska osnovna karta u mjerilu 1:5000 (Map) (in Serbo-Croatian). § Zagreb: 5 J 22 - 16.
- DGU (1965l). Hrvatska osnovna karta u mjerilu 1:5000 (Map) (in Serbo-Croatian). § Zagreb: 5 J 22 - 17.
- DGU (1965m). Hrvatska osnovna karta u mjerilu 1:5000 (Map) (in Serbo-Croatian). § Zagreb: 5 J 22 - 50.
- DGU (1967a). Hrvatska osnovna karta u mjerilu 1:5000 (Map) (in Serbo-Croatian). § Budinšćina: 5 K 24 - 13.
- DGU (1967b). Hrvatska osnovna karta u mjerilu 1:5000 (Map) (in Serbo-Croatian). § Budinšćina: 5 K 24 - 14.
- DGU (1967c). Hrvatska osnovna karta u mjerilu 1:5000 (Map) (in Serbo-Croatian). § Budinšćina: 5 K 24 - 15.
- DGU (1967d). Hrvatska osnovna karta u mjerilu 1:5000 (Map) (in Serbo-Croatian). § Budinšćina: 5 K 24 - 23.
- DGU (1967e). Hrvatska osnovna karta u mjerilu 1:5000 (Map) (in Serbo-Croatian). § Budinšćina: 5 K 24 - 24.
- DGU (1967f). Hrvatska osnovna karta u mjerilu 1:5000 (Map) (in Serbo-Croatian). § Budinšćina: 5 K 24 - 25.
- DGU (1967g). Hrvatska osnovna karta u mjerilu 1:5000 (Map) (in Serbo-Croatian). § Budinšćina: 5 K 24 - 33.
- DGU (1967h). Hrvatska osnovna karta u mjerilu 1:5000 (Map) (in Serbo-Croatian). § Budinšćina: 5 K 24 - 34.
- DGU (1967i). Hrvatska osnovna karta u mjerilu 1:5000 (Map) (in Serbo-Croatian). § Budinšćina: 5 K 24 - 35.
- DGU (1967j). Hrvatska osnovna karta u mjerilu 1:5000 (Map) (in Serbo-Croatian). § Budinšćina: 5 K 24 - 43.
- DGU (1967k). Hrvatska osnovna karta u mjerilu 1:5000 (Map) (in Serbo-Croatian). § Budinšćina: 5 K 24 - 44.
- DGU (1967l). Hrvatska osnovna karta u mjerilu 1:5000 (Map) (in Serbo-Croatian). § Budinšćina: 5 K 24 - 45.
- DGU (1967m). Hrvatska osnovna karta u mjerilu 1:5000 (Map) (in Serbo-Croatian). § Dugo Selo: 5 K 22 - 3.
- DGU (1967n). Hrvatska osnovna karta u mjerilu 1:5000 (Map) (in Serbo-Croatian). § Dugo Selo: 5 K 22 - 4.
- DGU (1967o). Hrvatska osnovna karta u mjerilu 1:5000 (Map) (in Serbo-Croatian). § Dugo Selo: 5 K 22 - 5.
- DGU (1967p). Hrvatska osnovna karta u mjerilu 1:5000 (Map) (in Serbo-Croatian). § Dugo Selo: 5 K 22 - 6.
- DGU (1967q). Hrvatska osnovna karta u mjerilu 1:5000 (Map) (in Serbo-Croatian). § Dugo Selo: 5 K 22 - 7.
- DGU (1967r). Hrvatska osnovna karta u mjerilu 1:5000 (Map) (in Serbo-Croatian). § Dugo Selo: 5 K 22 - 8.
- DGU (1967s). Hrvatska osnovna karta u mjerilu 1:5000 (Map) (in Serbo-Croatian). § Dugo Selo: 5 K 22 - 9.
- DGU (1967t). Hrvatska osnovna karta u mjerilu 1:5000 (Map) (in Serbo-Croatian). § Dugo Selo: 5 K 22 - 14.
- DGU (1967u). Hrvatska osnovna karta u mjerilu 1:5000 (Map) (in Serbo-Croatian). § Dugo Selo: 5 K 22 - 15.
- DGU (1967v). Hrvatska osnovna karta u mjerilu 1:5000 (Map) (in Serbo-Croatian). § Dugo Selo: 5 K 22 - 16.
- DGU (1967w). Hrvatska osnovna karta u mjerilu 1:5000 (Map) (in Serbo-Croatian). § Dugo Selo: 5 K 22 - 17.
- DGU (1967x). Hrvatska osnovna karta u mjerilu 1:5000 (Map) (in Serbo-Croatian). § Dugo Selo: 5 K 22 - 18.
- DGU (1967y). Hrvatska osnovna karta u mjerilu 1:5000 (Map) (in Serbo-Croatian). § Dugo Selo: 5 K 22 - 19.
- DGU (1967z). Hrvatska osnovna karta u mjerilu 1:5000 (Map) (in Serbo-Croatian). § Dugo Selo: 5 K 22 - 24.
- DGUb (1967a). Hrvatska osnovna karta u mjerilu 1:5000 (Map) (in Serbo-Croatian). § Dugo Selo: 5 K 22 - 25.
- DGUb (1967b). Hrvatska osnovna karta u mjerilu 1:5000 (Map) (in Serbo-Croatian). § Dugo Selo: 5 K 22 - 26.
- DGUb (1967c). Hrvatska osnovna karta u mjerilu 1:5000 (Map) (in Serbo-Croatian). § Dugo Selo: 5 K 22 - 27.
- DGUb (1967d). Hrvatska osnovna karta u mjerilu 1:5000 (Map) (in Serbo-Croatian). § Dugo Selo: 5 K 22 - 28.
- DGUb (1967e). Hrvatska osnovna karta u mjerilu 1:5000 (Map) (in Serbo-Croatian). § Dugo Selo: 5 K 22 - 31.
- DGUb (1967f). Hrvatska osnovna karta u mjerilu 1:5000 (Map) (in Serbo-Croatian). § Dugo Selo: 5 K 22 - 32.
- DGUb (1967g). Hrvatska osnovna karta u mjerilu 1:5000 (Map) (in Serbo-Croatian). § Dugo Selo: 5 K 22 - 36.
- DGUb (1967h). Hrvatska osnovna karta u mjerilu 1:5000 (Map) (in Serbo-Croatian). § Dugo Selo: 5 K 22 - 37.
- DGUb (1967i). Hrvatska osnovna karta u mjerilu 1:5000 (Map) (in Serbo-Croatian). § Dugo Selo: 5 K 22 - 38.
- DGUb (1967j). Hrvatska osnovna karta u mjerilu 1:5000 (Map) (in Serbo-Croatian). § Dugo Selo: 5 K 22 - 47.
- DGUb (1967k). Hrvatska osnovna karta u mjerilu 1:5000 (Map) (in Serbo-Croatian). § Dugo Selo: 5 K 22 - 48.
- DGUb (1967l). Hrvatska osnovna karta u mjerilu 1:5000 (Map) (in Serbo-Croatian). § Dugo Selo: 5 K 22 - 49.
- DGUb (1967m). Hrvatska osnovna karta u mjerilu 1:5000 (Map) (in Serbo-Croatian). § Samobor: 5 I 22 - 20.
- DGUb (1967n). Hrvatska osnovna karta u mjerilu 1:5000 (Map) (in Serbo-Croatian). § Sveti Ivan Zelina: 5 K 23 - 3.
- DGUb (1967o). Hrvatska osnovna karta u mjerilu 1:5000 (Map) (in Serbo-Croatian). § Sveti Ivan Zelina: 5 K 23 - 4.
- DGUb (1967p). Hrvatska osnovna karta u mjerilu 1:5000 (Map) (in Serbo-Croatian). § Sveti Ivan Zelina: 5 K 23 - 5.
- DGUb (1967q). Hrvatska osnovna karta u mjerilu 1:5000 (Map) (in Serbo-Croatian). § Sveti Ivan Zelina: 5 K 23 - 13.
- DGUb (1967r). Hrvatska osnovna karta u mjerilu 1:5000 (Map) (in Serbo-Croatian). § Sveti Ivan Zelina: 5 K 23 - 14.
- DGUb (1967s). Hrvatska osnovna karta u mjerilu 1:5000 (Map) (in Serbo-Croatian). § Sveti Ivan Zelina: 5 K 23 - 15.
- DGUb (1967t). Hrvatska osnovna karta u mjerilu 1:5000 (Map) (in Serbo-Croatian). § Sveti Ivan Zelina: 5 K 23 - 23.
- DGUb (1967u). Hrvatska osnovna karta u mjerilu 1:5000 (Map) (in Serbo-Croatian). § Sveti Ivan Zelina: 5 K 23 - 24.
- DGUb (1967v). Hrvatska osnovna karta u mjerilu 1:5000 (Map) (in Serbo-Croatian). § Sveti Ivan Zelina: 5 K 23 - 25.
- DGUb (1967w). Hrvatska osnovna karta u mjerilu 1:5000 (Map) (in Serbo-Croatian). § Sveti Ivan Zelina: 5 K 23 - 33.
- DGUb (1967x). Hrvatska osnovna karta u mjerilu 1:5000 (Map) (in Serbo-Croatian). § Sveti Ivan Zelina: 5 K 23 - 34.
- DGUb (1967y). Hrvatska osnovna karta u mjerilu 1:5000 (Map) (in Serbo-Croatian). § Sveti Ivan Zelina: 5 K 23 - 35.
- DGUb (1967z). Hrvatska osnovna karta u mjerilu 1:5000 (Map) (in Serbo-Croatian). § Sveti Ivan Zelina: 5 K 23 - 43.
- DGUc (1967a). Hrvatska osnovna karta u mjerilu 1:5000 (Map) (in Serbo-Croatian). § Sveti Ivan Zelina: 5 K 23 - 44.
- DGUc (1967b). Hrvatska osnovna karta u mjerilu 1:5000 (Map) (in Serbo-Croatian). § Sveti Ivan Zelina: 5 K 23 - 45.
- DGUc (1967c). Hrvatska osnovna karta u mjerilu 1:5000 (Map) (in Serbo-Croatian). § Zagreb: 5 J 22 - 22.
- DGU (1968a). Hrvatska osnovna karta u mjerilu 1:5000 (Map) (in Serbo-Croatian). § Donja Stubica: 5 J 23 - 43.
- DGU (1968b). Hrvatska osnovna karta u mjerilu 1:5000 (Map) (in Serbo-Croatian). § Donja Stubica: 5 J 23 - 44.
- DGU (1968c). Hrvatska osnovna karta u mjerilu 1:5000 (Map) (in Serbo-Croatian). § Donja Stubica: 5 J 23 - 45.
- DGU (1968d). Hrvatska osnovna karta u mjerilu 1:5000 (Map) (in Serbo-Croatian). § Donja Stubica: 5 J 23 - 46.
- DGU (1968e). Hrvatska osnovna karta u mjerilu 1:5000 (Map) (in Serbo-Croatian). § Samobor: 5 I 22 - 30.
- DGU (1968f). Hrvatska osnovna karta u mjerilu 1:5000 (Map) (in Serbo-Croatian). § Zagreb: 5 J 22 - 2.
- DGU (1968g). Hrvatska osnovna karta u mjerilu 1:5000 (Map) (in Serbo-Croatian). § Zagreb: 5 J 22 - 3.
- DGU (1968h). Hrvatska osnovna karta u mjerilu 1:5000 (Map) (in Serbo-Croatian). § Zagreb: 5 J 22 - 4.
- DGU (1968i). Hrvatska osnovna karta u mjerilu 1:5000 (Map) (in Serbo-Croatian). § Zagreb: 5 J 22 - 5.
- DGU (1968j). Hrvatska osnovna karta u mjerilu 1:5000 (Map) (in Serbo-Croatian). § Zagreb: 5 J 22 - 6.
- DGU (1968k). Hrvatska osnovna karta u mjerilu 1:5000 (Map) (in Serbo-Croatian). § Zagreb: 5 J 22 - 11.
- DGU (1968l). Hrvatska osnovna karta u mjerilu 1:5000 (Map) (in Serbo-Croatian). § Zagreb: 5 J 22 - 12.
- DGU (1968m). Hrvatska osnovna karta u mjerilu 1:5000 (Map) (in Serbo-Croatian). § Zagreb: 5 J 22 - 13.
- DGU (1968n). Hrvatska osnovna karta u mjerilu 1:5000 (Map) (in Serbo-Croatian). § Zagreb: 5 J 22 - 14.
- DGU (1968o). Hrvatska osnovna karta u mjerilu 1:5000 (Map) (in Serbo-Croatian). § Zagreb: 5 J 22 - 15.
- DGU (1969a). Hrvatska osnovna karta u mjerilu 1:5000 (Map) (in Serbo-Croatian). § Donja Stubica: 5 J 23 - 41.
- DGU (1969b). Hrvatska osnovna karta u mjerilu 1:5000 (Map) (in Serbo-Croatian). § Donja Stubica: 5 J 23 - 42.
- DGU (1969c). Hrvatska osnovna karta u mjerilu 1:5000 (Map) (in Serbo-Croatian). § Samobor: 5 I 22 - 9.
- DGU (1969d). Hrvatska osnovna karta u mjerilu 1:5000 (Map) (in Serbo-Croatian). § Samobor: 5 I 22 - 10.
- DGU (1969e). Hrvatska osnovna karta u mjerilu 1:5000 (Map) (in Serbo-Croatian). § Veliko Trgovišće: 5 I 23 - 49.
- DGU (1969f). Hrvatska osnovna karta u mjerilu 1:5000 (Map) (in Serbo-Croatian). § Veliko Trgovišće: 5 I 23 - 50.
- DGU (1969g). Hrvatska osnovna karta u mjerilu 1:5000 (Map) (in Serbo-Croatian). § Zagreb: 5 J 22 - 1.
- DGU (1975a). Hrvatska osnovna karta u mjerilu 1:5000 (Map) (in Serbo-Croatian). § Donja Stubica: 5 J 23 - 29.
- DGU (1975b). Hrvatska osnovna karta u mjerilu 1:5000 (Map) (in Serbo-Croatian). § Donja Stubica: 5 J 23 - 30.
- DGU (1975c). Hrvatska osnovna karta u mjerilu 1:5000 (Map) (in Serbo-Croatian). § Donja Stubica: 5 J 23 - 37.
- DGU (1975d). Hrvatska osnovna karta u mjerilu 1:5000 (Map) (in Serbo-Croatian). § Donja Stubica: 5 J 23 - 38.
- DGU (1975e). Hrvatska osnovna karta u mjerilu 1:5000 (Map) (in Serbo-Croatian). § Donja Stubica: 5 J 23 - 39.
- DGU (1975f). Hrvatska osnovna karta u mjerilu 1:5000 (Map) (in Serbo-Croatian). § Donja Stubica: 5 J 23 - 40.
- DGU (1975g). Hrvatska osnovna karta u mjerilu 1:5000 (Map) (in Serbo-Croatian). § Donja Stubica: 5 J 23 - 48.
- DGU (1975h). Hrvatska osnovna karta u mjerilu 1:5000 (Map) (in Serbo-Croatian). § Donja Stubica: 5 J 23 - 49.
- DGU (1975i). Hrvatska osnovna karta u mjerilu 1:5000 (Map) (in Serbo-Croatian). § Donja Stubica: 5 J 23 - 50.
- DGU (1975j). Hrvatska osnovna karta u mjerilu 1:5000 (Map) (in Serbo-Croatian). § Dugo Selo: 5 K 22 - 1.
- DGU (1975k). Hrvatska osnovna karta u mjerilu 1:5000 (Map) (in Serbo-Croatian). § Dugo Selo: 5 K 22 - 2.
- DGU (1975l). Hrvatska osnovna karta u mjerilu 1:5000 (Map) (in Serbo-Croatian). § Dugo Selo: 5 K 22 - 11.
- DGU (1975m). Hrvatska osnovna karta u mjerilu 1:5000 (Map) (in Serbo-Croatian). § Dugo Selo: 5 K 22 - 12.
- DGU (1975n). Hrvatska osnovna karta u mjerilu 1:5000 (Map) (in Serbo-Croatian). § Dugo Selo: 5 K 22 - 13.
- DGU (1975o). Hrvatska osnovna karta u mjerilu 1:5000 (Map) (in Serbo-Croatian). § Dugo Selo: 5 K 22 - 21.
- DGU (1975p). Hrvatska osnovna karta u mjerilu 1:5000 (Map) (in Serbo-Croatian). § Dugo Selo: 5 K 22 - 22.
- DGU (1975q). Hrvatska osnovna karta u mjerilu 1:5000 (Map) (in Serbo-Croatian). § Dugo Selo: 5 K 22 - 23.
- DGU (1975r). Hrvatska osnovna karta u mjerilu 1:5000 (Map) (in Serbo-Croatian). § Sveti Ivan Zelina: 5 K 23 - 31.
- DGU (1975s). Hrvatska osnovna karta u mjerilu 1:5000 (Map) (in Serbo-Croatian). § Sveti Ivan Zelina: 5 K 23 - 32.
- DGU (1975t). Hrvatska osnovna karta u mjerilu 1:5000 (Map) (in Serbo-Croatian). § Sveti Ivan Zelina: 5 K 23 - 41.
- DGU (1975u). Hrvatska osnovna karta u mjerilu 1:5000 (Map) (in Serbo-Croatian). § Sveti Ivan Zelina: 5 K 23 - 42.
- DGU (1975v). Hrvatska osnovna karta u mjerilu 1:5000 (Map) (in Serbo-Croatian). § Zagreb: 5 J 22 - 8.
- DGU (1975w). Hrvatska osnovna karta u mjerilu 1:5000 (Map) (in Serbo-Croatian). § Zagreb: 5 J 22 - 9.
- DGU (1975x). Hrvatska osnovna karta u mjerilu 1:5000 (Map) (in Serbo-Croatian). § Zagreb: 5 J 22 - 18.
- DGU (1975y). Hrvatska osnovna karta u mjerilu 1:5000 (Map) (in Serbo-Croatian). § Zagreb: 5 J 22 - 19.
- DGU (1975z). Hrvatska osnovna karta u mjerilu 1:5000 (Map) (in Serbo-Croatian). § Zagreb: 5 J 22 - 20.
- DGUb (1975a). Hrvatska osnovna karta u mjerilu 1:5000 (Map) (in Serbo-Croatian). § Zagreb: 5 J 22 - 28.
- DGUb (1975b). Hrvatska osnovna karta u mjerilu 1:5000 (Map) (in Serbo-Croatian). § Zagreb: 5 J 22 - 29.
- DGUb (1975c). Hrvatska osnovna karta u mjerilu 1:5000 (Map) (in Serbo-Croatian). § Zagreb: 5 J 22 - 30.
- DGUb (1975d). Hrvatska osnovna karta u mjerilu 1:5000 (Map) (in Serbo-Croatian). § Zagreb: 5 J 22 - 38.
- DGUb (1975e). Hrvatska osnovna karta u mjerilu 1:5000 (Map) (in Serbo-Croatian). § Zagreb: 5 J 22 - 39.
- DGUb (1975f). Hrvatska osnovna karta u mjerilu 1:5000 (Map) (in Serbo-Croatian). § Zagreb: 5 J 22 - 40.
- DGUb (1977g). Hrvatska osnovna karta u mjerilu 1:5000 (Map) (in Serbo-Croatian). § Donja Stubica: 5 J 23 - 11.
- DGUb (1977h). Hrvatska osnovna karta u mjerilu 1:5000 (Map) (in Serbo-Croatian). § Donja Stubica: 5 J 23 - 12.
- DGUb (1977i). Hrvatska osnovna karta u mjerilu 1:5000 (Map) (in Serbo-Croatian). § Donja Stubica: 5 J 23 - 13.
- DGUb (1977j). Hrvatska osnovna karta u mjerilu 1:5000 (Map) (in Serbo-Croatian). § Donja Stubica: 5 J 23 - 14.
- DGUb (1977k). Hrvatska osnovna karta u mjerilu 1:5000 (Map) (in Serbo-Croatian). § Donja Stubica: 5 J 23 - 15.
- DGUb (1977l). Hrvatska osnovna karta u mjerilu 1:5000 (Map) (in Serbo-Croatian). § Donja Stubica: 5 J 23 - 16.
- DGUb (1977m). Hrvatska osnovna karta u mjerilu 1:5000 (Map) (in Serbo-Croatian). § Donja Stubica: 5 J 23 - 21.
- DGUb (1977n). Hrvatska osnovna karta u mjerilu 1:5000 (Map) (in Serbo-Croatian). § Donja Stubica: 5 J 23 - 22.
- DGUb (1977o). Hrvatska osnovna karta u mjerilu 1:5000 (Map) (in Serbo-Croatian). § Donja Stubica: 5 J 23 - 23.
- DGUb (1977p). Hrvatska osnovna karta u mjerilu 1:5000 (Map) (in Serbo-Croatian). § Donja Stubica: 5 J 23 - 24.
- DGUb (1977q). Hrvatska osnovna karta u mjerilu 1:5000 (Map) (in Serbo-Croatian). § Donja Stubica: 5 J 23 - 25.
- DGUb (1977r). Hrvatska osnovna karta u mjerilu 1:5000 (Map) (in Serbo-Croatian). § Donja Stubica: 5 J 23 - 26.
- DGU (1979a). Hrvatska osnovna karta u mjerilu 1:5000 (Map) (in Serbo-Croatian). § Ivanić Grad: 5 K 21 - 1.
- DGU (1979b). Hrvatska osnovna karta u mjerilu 1:5000 (Map) (in Serbo-Croatian). § Ivanić Grad: 5 K 21 - 2.
- DGU (1979c). Hrvatska osnovna karta u mjerilu 1:5000 (Map) (in Serbo-Croatian). § Ivanić Grad: 5 K 21 - 3.
- DGU (1979d). Hrvatska osnovna karta u mjerilu 1:5000 (Map) (in Serbo-Croatian). § Ivanić Grad: 5 K 21 - 4.
- DGU (1979e). Hrvatska osnovna karta u mjerilu 1:5000 (Map) (in Serbo-Croatian). § Ivanić Grad: 5 K 21 - 5.
- DGU (1979f). Hrvatska osnovna karta u mjerilu 1:5000 (Map) (in Serbo-Croatian). § Ivanić Grad: 5 K 21 - 6.
- DGU (1979g). Hrvatska osnovna karta u mjerilu 1:5000 (Map) (in Serbo-Croatian). § Ivanić Grad: 5 K 21 - 7.
- DGU (1979h). Hrvatska osnovna karta u mjerilu 1:5000 (Map) (in Serbo-Croatian). § Ivanić Grad: 5 K 21 - 8.
- DGU (1979i). Hrvatska osnovna karta u mjerilu 1:5000 (Map) (in Serbo-Croatian). § Ivanić Grad: 5 K 21 - 13.
- DGU (1979j). Hrvatska osnovna karta u mjerilu 1:5000 (Map) (in Serbo-Croatian). § Ivanić Grad: 5 K 21 - 14.
- DGU (1979k). Hrvatska osnovna karta u mjerilu 1:5000 (Map) (in Serbo-Croatian). § Ivanić Grad: 5 K 21 - 15.
- DGU (1979l). Hrvatska osnovna karta u mjerilu 1:5000 (Map) (in Serbo-Croatian). § Ivanić Grad: 5 K 21 - 16.
- DGU (1979m). Hrvatska osnovna karta u mjerilu 1:5000 (Map) (in Serbo-Croatian). § Ivanić Grad: 5 K 21 - 17.
- DGU (1979n). Hrvatska osnovna karta u mjerilu 1:5000 (Map) (in Serbo-Croatian). § Ivanić Grad: 5 K 21 - 18.
- DGU (1979o). Hrvatska osnovna karta u mjerilu 1:5000 (Map) (in Serbo-Croatian). § Ivanić Grad: 5 K 21 - 19.
- DGU (1979p). Hrvatska osnovna karta u mjerilu 1:5000 (Map) (in Serbo-Croatian). § Ivanić Grad: 5 K 21 - 23.
- DGU (1979q). Hrvatska osnovna karta u mjerilu 1:5000 (Map) (in Serbo-Croatian). § Ivanić Grad: 5 K 21 - 24.
- DGU (1979r). Hrvatska osnovna karta u mjerilu 1:5000 (Map) (in Serbo-Croatian). § Ivanić Grad: 5 K 21 - 25.
- DGU (1979s). Hrvatska osnovna karta u mjerilu 1:5000 (Map) (in Serbo-Croatian). § Ivanić Grad: 5 K 21 - 26.
- DGU (1979t). Hrvatska osnovna karta u mjerilu 1:5000 (Map) (in Serbo-Croatian). § Ivanić Grad: 5 K 21 - 27.
- DGU (1979u). Hrvatska osnovna karta u mjerilu 1:5000 (Map) (in Serbo-Croatian). § Ivanić Grad: 5 K 21 - 28.
- DGU (1979v). Hrvatska osnovna karta u mjerilu 1:5000 (Map) (in Serbo-Croatian). § Ivanić Grad: 5 K 21 - 29.
- DGU (1979w). Hrvatska osnovna karta u mjerilu 1:5000 (Map) (in Serbo-Croatian). § Ivanić Grad: 5 K 21 - 34.
- DGU (1979x). Hrvatska osnovna karta u mjerilu 1:5000 (Map) (in Serbo-Croatian). § Ivanić Grad: 5 K 21 - 35.
- DGU (1979y). Hrvatska osnovna karta u mjerilu 1:5000 (Map) (in Serbo-Croatian). § Ivanić Grad: 5 K 21 - 36.
- DGU (1979z). Hrvatska osnovna karta u mjerilu 1:5000 (Map) (in Serbo-Croatian). § Ivanić Grad: 5 K 21 - 37.
- DGUb (1979a). Hrvatska osnovna karta u mjerilu 1:5000 (Map) (in Serbo-Croatian). § Ivanić Grad: 5 K 21 - 38.
- DGU (1981a). Hrvatska osnovna karta u mjerilu 1:5000 (Map) (in Serbo-Croatian). § Donja Stubica: 5 J 23 - 2.
- DGU (1981b). Hrvatska osnovna karta u mjerilu 1:5000 (Map) (in Serbo-Croatian). § Donja Stubica: 5 J 23 - 3.
- DGU (1981c). Hrvatska osnovna karta u mjerilu 1:5000 (Map) (in Serbo-Croatian). § Donja Stubica: 5 J 23 - 4.
- DGU (1981d). Hrvatska osnovna karta u mjerilu 1:5000 (Map) (in Serbo-Croatian). § Donja Stubica: 5 J 23 - 5.
- DGU (1981e). Hrvatska osnovna karta u mjerilu 1:5000 (Map) (in Serbo-Croatian). § Veliko Trgovišće: 5 I 23 - 20.
- DGU (1981f). Hrvatska osnovna karta u mjerilu 1:5000 (Map) (in Serbo-Croatian). § Veliko Trgovišće: 5 I 23 - 29.
- DGU (1981g). Hrvatska osnovna karta u mjerilu 1:5000 (Map) (in Serbo-Croatian). § Veliko Trgovišće: 5 I 23 - 30.
- DGU (1981h). Hrvatska osnovna karta u mjerilu 1:5000 (Map) (in Serbo-Croatian). § Zlatar: 5 J 24 - 46.
- DGU (1981i). Hrvatska osnovna karta u mjerilu 1:5000 (Map) (in Serbo-Croatian). § Zlatar: 5 J 24 - 47.
- DGU (1982a). Hrvatska osnovna karta u mjerilu 1:5000 (Map) (in Serbo-Croatian). § Budinšćina: 5 K 24 - 4.
- DGU (1982b). Hrvatska osnovna karta u mjerilu 1:5000 (Map) (in Serbo-Croatian). § Budinšćina: 5 K 24 - 5.
- DGU (1982c). Hrvatska osnovna karta u mjerilu 1:5000 (Map) (in Serbo-Croatian). § Dugo Selo: 5 K 22 - 10.
- DGU (1982d). Hrvatska osnovna karta u mjerilu 1:5000 (Map) (in Serbo-Croatian). § Dugo Selo: 5 K 22 - 20.
- DGU (1982e). Hrvatska osnovna karta u mjerilu 1:5000 (Map) (in Serbo-Croatian). § Obreška: 5 L 22 - 1.
- DGU (1982f). Hrvatska osnovna karta u mjerilu 1:5000 (Map) (in Serbo-Croatian). § Obreška: 5 L 22 - 11.
- DGU (1982g). Hrvatska osnovna karta u mjerilu 1:5000 (Map) (in Serbo-Croatian). § Obreška: 5 L 22 - 12.
- DGU (1983a). Hrvatska osnovna karta u mjerilu 1:5000 (Map) (in Serbo-Croatian). § Budinšćina: 5 K 24 - 3.
- DGU (1983b). Hrvatska osnovna karta u mjerilu 1:5000 (Map) (in Serbo-Croatian). § Budinšćina: 5 K 24 - 12.
- DGU (1983c). Hrvatska osnovna karta u mjerilu 1:5000 (Map) (in Serbo-Croatian). § Budinšćina: 5 K 24 - 22.
- DGU (1983d). Hrvatska osnovna karta u mjerilu 1:5000 (Map) (in Serbo-Croatian). § Budinšćina: 5 K 24 - 32.
- DGU (1983e). Hrvatska osnovna karta u mjerilu 1:5000 (Map) (in Serbo-Croatian). § Budinšćina: 5 K 24 - 41.
- DGU (1983f). Hrvatska osnovna karta u mjerilu 1:5000 (Map) (in Serbo-Croatian). § Budinšćina: 5 K 24 - 42.
- DGU (1983g). Hrvatska osnovna karta u mjerilu 1:5000 (Map) (in Serbo-Croatian). § Donja Stubica: 5 J 23 - 6.
- DGU (1983h). Hrvatska osnovna karta u mjerilu 1:5000 (Map) (in Serbo-Croatian). § Donja Stubica: 5 J 23 - 7.
- DGU (1983i). Hrvatska osnovna karta u mjerilu 1:5000 (Map) (in Serbo-Croatian). § Donja Stubica: 5 J 23 - 8.
- DGU (1983j). Hrvatska osnovna karta u mjerilu 1:5000 (Map) (in Serbo-Croatian). § Donja Stubica: 5 J 23 - 9.
- DGU (1983k). Hrvatska osnovna karta u mjerilu 1:5000 (Map) (in Serbo-Croatian). § Donja Stubica: 5 J 23 - 10.
- DGU (1983l). Hrvatska osnovna karta u mjerilu 1:5000 (Map) (in Serbo-Croatian). § Donja Stubica: 5 J 23 - 17.
- DGU (1983m). Hrvatska osnovna karta u mjerilu 1:5000 (Map) (in Serbo-Croatian). § Donja Stubica: 5 J 23 - 18.
- DGU (1983n). Hrvatska osnovna karta u mjerilu 1:5000 (Map) (in Serbo-Croatian). § Donja Stubica: 5 J 23 - 19.
- DGU (1983o). Hrvatska osnovna karta u mjerilu 1:5000 (Map) (in Serbo-Croatian). § Donja Stubica: 5 J 23 - 20.
- DGU (1983p). Hrvatska osnovna karta u mjerilu 1:5000 (Map) (in Serbo-Croatian). § Donja Stubica: 5 J 23 - 27.
- DGU (1983q). Hrvatska osnovna karta u mjerilu 1:5000 (Map) (in Serbo-Croatian). § Donja Stubica: 5 J 23 - 28.
- DGU (1983r). Hrvatska osnovna karta u mjerilu 1:5000 (Map) (in Serbo-Croatian). § Sveti Ivan Zelina: 5 K 23 - 1.
- DGU (1983s). Hrvatska osnovna karta u mjerilu 1:5000 (Map) (in Serbo-Croatian). § Sveti Ivan Zelina: 5 K 23 - 2.
- DGU (1983t). Hrvatska osnovna karta u mjerilu 1:5000 (Map) (in Serbo-Croatian). § Sveti Ivan Zelina: 5 K 23 - 11.
- DGU (1983u). Hrvatska osnovna karta u mjerilu 1:5000 (Map) (in Serbo-Croatian). § Sveti Ivan Zelina: 5 K 23 - 12.
- DGU (1983v). Hrvatska osnovna karta u mjerilu 1:5000 (Map) (in Serbo-Croatian). § Sveti Ivan Zelina: 5 K 23 - 21.
- DGU (1983w). Hrvatska osnovna karta u mjerilu 1:5000 (Map) (in Serbo-Croatian). § Sveti Ivan Zelina: 5 K 23 - 22.
- DGU (1984a). Hrvatska osnovna karta u mjerilu 1:5000 (Map) (in Serbo-Croatian). § Donja Stubica: 5 J 23 - 31.
- DGU (1984b). Hrvatska osnovna karta u mjerilu 1:5000 (Map) (in Serbo-Croatian). § Donja Stubica: 5 J 23 - 32.
- DGU (1984c). Hrvatska osnovna karta u mjerilu 1:5000 (Map) (in Serbo-Croatian). § Donja Stubica: 5 J 23 - 33.
- DGU (1984d). Hrvatska osnovna karta u mjerilu 1:5000 (Map) (in Serbo-Croatian). § Donja Stubica: 5 J 23 - 34.
- DGU (1984e). Hrvatska osnovna karta u mjerilu 1:5000 (Map) (in Serbo-Croatian). § Donja Stubica: 5 J 23 - 35.
- DGU (1984f). Hrvatska osnovna karta u mjerilu 1:5000 (Map) (in Serbo-Croatian). § Donja Stubica: 5 J 23 - 36.
- DGU (1984g). Hrvatska osnovna karta u mjerilu 1:5000 (Map) (in Serbo-Croatian). § Ivanić Grad: 5 K 21 - 47.
- DGU (1984h). Hrvatska osnovna karta u mjerilu 1:5000 (Map) (in Serbo-Croatian). § Ivanić Grad: 5 K 21 - 48.
- DGU (1984i). Hrvatska osnovna karta u mjerilu 1:5000 (Map) (in Serbo-Croatian). § Ivanić Grad: 5 K 21 - 49.
- DGU (1984j). Hrvatska osnovna karta u mjerilu 1:5000 (Map) (in Serbo-Croatian). § Veliko Trgovišće: 5 I 23 - 39.
- DGU (1984k). Hrvatska osnovna karta u mjerilu 1:5000 (Map) (in Serbo-Croatian). § Veliko Trgovišće: 5 I 23 - 40.
- DGU (1984l). Hrvatska osnovna karta u mjerilu 1:5000 (Map) (in Serbo-Croatian). § Zlatar: 5 J 24 - 48.
- DGU (1984m). Hrvatska osnovna karta u mjerilu 1:5000 (Map) (in Serbo-Croatian). § Zlatar: 5 J 24 - 49.
- DGU (1984n). Hrvatska osnovna karta u mjerilu 1:5000 (Map) (in Serbo-Croatian). § Zlatar: 5 J 24 - 50.
