= Grmoščica =

Hill in Zagreb, Croatia

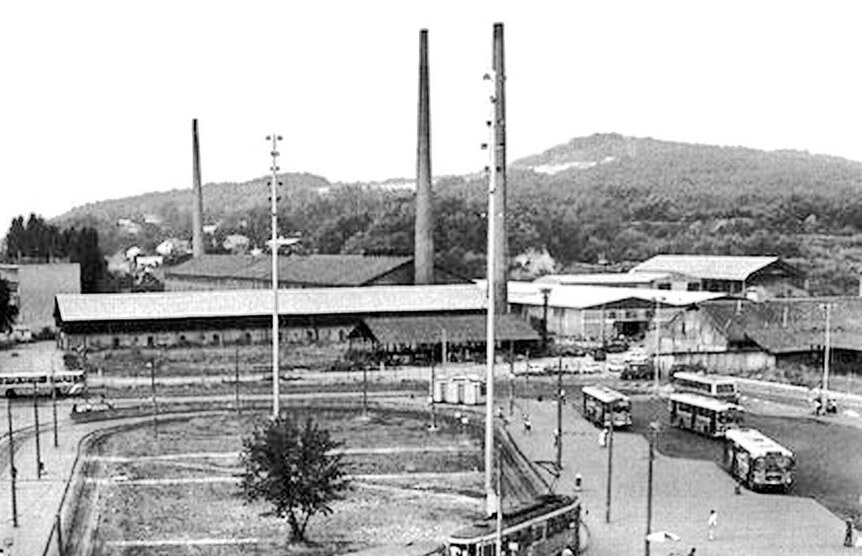
- Črnomerec with Milerov breg in the foreground and Grmoščica in the background.

Highest point
- Elevation: 239.26 metres (785.0 ft)
- Coordinates: 45°49′05″N 15°55′00″E

Geography
- Location within Croatia
- Location: Medvednica
- Parent range: Zagrebačka gora

Grmoščica or Grmošćica is a hill on Medvednica mountain in central Croatia, just north of Zagreb. Its highest peak is 239 m.

== Etymology ==
The form Grmoščica is Kajkavian, whereas the form Grmošćica is a correction according to the Croatian standard. It consists of a root inherited from Proto-Slavic grъmъ + -oš + -čica. A dialectal form Grmovčica is also encountered. Both spellings continue to be used. Certain historical forms attest to grmļski + -ica.

In other dialects, the word grmoščica is used to refer to the mushroom Desarmillaria tabescens or Armillaria tabescens.

== Biology ==
=== Flora ===
Trees include Castanea sativa, Fagus sylvatica, Quercus petraea, Salix alba, S. purpurea, and others.

There is currently a Robinia pseudoacacia infestation, and foresters are trying to force the growth of native Q. petraea and F. sylvatica to combat it. The local C. sativa population is still badly affected by Cryphonectria parasitica.

The lichen species found on oak bark on the hill are Flavoparmelia caperata and Hypogymnia physodes.

Basidiomycetes include Amanita caesarea, Hygrophorus eburneus, Laeticutis cristata, Lycoperdon perlatum, Russula cyanoxantha.

=== Fauna ===
Insects include Subcoccinella vigintiquatuorpunctata and the invasive species Dryocosmus kuriphilus, the latter a risk for the spread of Cryphonectria parasitica.

== Geoscience ==
=== Geology ===
An approximately 20 metres (66 ft) thick open profile of terrestrial non-carbonate loess can be observed in the former clay pit of Grmiščica. These Quaternary deposits were sampled in 2017 and determined to belong to the Bistra unit. They are not separated from the underlying Upper Pliocene strata, which are exposed on the northern flanks of Grmoščica. Fossils of fish and mammals have been found on the southeast flanks of the hill.

Tectonically, Grmoščica is transected northweast-to-southwest by a relatively lowered block.

Grmoščica is home to some of the most active landslides in Zagreb. A large area of the forest on Grmoščica is under private ownership, which has resulted in forest loss, which has led to landslide formation. The main landslide, the Grmoščica Landslide, spans an area of 2 hectares (4.9 acres), with a depth of 5–9 metres (16–30 ft). The first, partial stage of landslide remediation was completed at the end of 2007, in response to some recent wet mass movement. Some have had to leave their homes because of the landslide even after remediation. The landslide is still active as of 2025.

=== Speleology ===
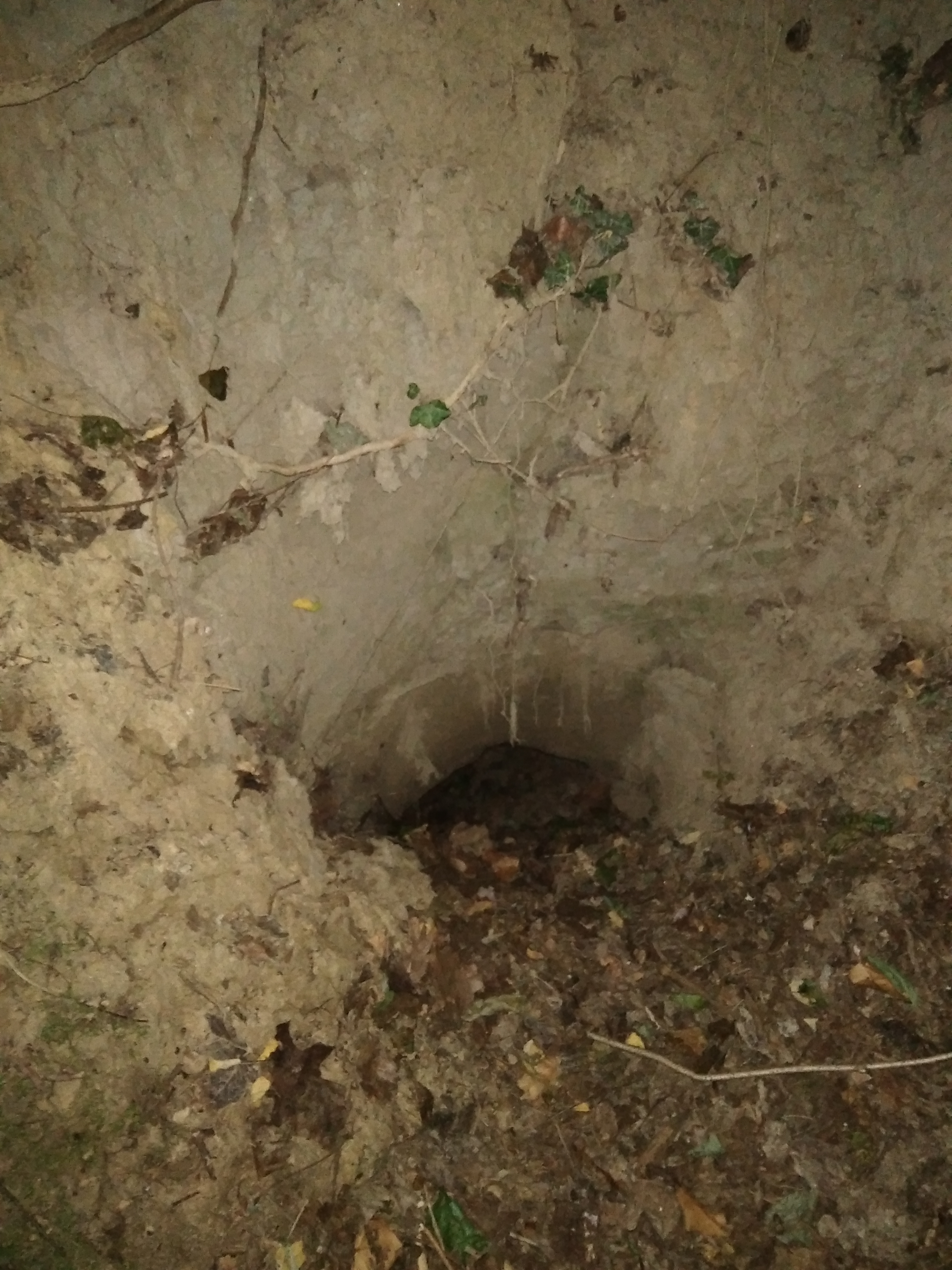
Primary entrance to Kustošijanka

Kustošijanka is a cave with two entrances and 44 m of passageway on the north slope of a valley on the east side of Grmoščica. It is located on the fault line dividing Grmoščica in half from northeast to southwest. Its entrance is at an elevation of 155 m. The caver Darko Višek learned of its existence in conversation with local resident Vlado Krapljan, who was among the visitors who left many names and dates inscribed on the walls of the cave in their childhood. It formed in Upper Pontian layers of marlstone, duststone, and sandstone: "Rhomboidea layers", deposited in brackish conditions. Thanks to being on a landslide-prone part of the hill, the entrance became covered at some point after 1993 and could only be passed following digging in 2010.

== Clay pit ==
An inactive 15.85 ha clay pit remains in situ on the southeast side of the hill. It was exploited by Ciglana Zagreb d.o.o., the largest brick factory in the Republic of Croatia at one point. Because it was encompassed by Zagreb, further digging became impossible, leading to its abandonment.

== Forest Park ==
The Forest Park Grmoščica is 76.9 hectares (190 acres) in area, of which 63.6 hectares (157 acres) is forested, of which 46.81 hectares (115.7 acres) is state owned. The average wood stock is 274.6 cubic metres (9,700 ft^{3}) per hectare, and average current annual increment 7.6 cubic metres (270 ft^{3}) per hectare.

A reforestation project ran concurrent with its designation as a forest park in the 1960s. The forest park was also to serve as a windbreak for the landslide. It is planned to renew the Populus population in two cuts, to bring in 15,000 Q. petraea seedlings per hectare and to reforest cleared areas with Picea abies, Pinus species an others.

The park is one of the few places in Zagreb where dogs are allowed without a leash.

Grmoščica is an important UHI refuge alongside Maksimir and Tuškanac, exhibiting a significantly decreased temperature relative to surrounding areas.

=== Recreation ===
The arrangement of the Forest Park Grmoščica for recreation has been described as "neglected" by authorities. This began to change following the inclusion of the addition of recreational infrastructure to the park plan. A series of new downhill bicycle routes were added in 2021, although the majority of routes had been constructed on private initiative.

One of the earliest and more successful branches of the Croatian Pin Bowling Federation, Grmoščica, founded in 1938, meets on the hill. Within Yugoslavia, they won the male national cup 9 times.

Grmoščica sometimes hosts Mountain biking races, including the Grma mini DH competition in April 2011 won by Berislav Topol, the Downhill Grma competition in May 2015, an Enduro race in 2021 won by Frano Liović and an XCO competition in March 2022.

The view from the top of Grmoščica has been described as "the most beautiful view of Zagreb".

== History ==
The oldest surviving mention of the hill is in a 1217 document under the name Gremla. At the time, it belonged to the Kaptol cathedral chapter, bordering Gradec across the Kustošak. It was next mentioned as "Girymla" in a 1221 land grant of King Andrew II of Hungary, and as "Geremla" in the 1334 Kaptol statute. The hill itself was known in those days as "Muddy hill" (Latin: Mons limosus), because of its clay. Nearby was the Panteluč hill, which remains unidentified. According to Dobronić, it cannot have been Pantovčak.

On 21 February 2018, a dead male body was found in the forest near the Zeleni vrh street.

== Infrastructure ==
The Roman road known in medieval times as Magna strata, in use at least as late as the 14th century, ran along its southern foot, somewhat north of Ilica. Grmoščica also gave its name to several streets in Zagreb, including (as of the 1950s) Grmoščica I, Grmoščica V and Grmoščica ogranak II and III.

Ecclesiastically, Grmoščica belongs to the Gajnice parish, founded 4 April 1971 when it was split from Stenjevec.

In SFRY times, an outing site at the address Grmoščica 44 was operated by the now-defunct Hospitality Enterprise "Černomerec" (Serbo-Croatian: Ugostiteljsko poduzeće "Černomerec"), which also ran the "Mokrice" restaurant on Ilica 241 and the inns "Borčec" (Ilica 229) and "Banja Luka" (Ilica 285). There was also a feather factory on Grmoščica.

A singing society in Zagreb bears the name "Grmoščica". Its badge features a golden harp over a Croatian tricolour.

== Selected works ==
The most recent bibliographies dedicated to Grmoščica were published in Mravunac 2015 and Radić 2020. Other bibliographies exist devoted to specific aspects of Grmoščica, such as its history.

- General: LMK 2002
- Astronomy: Abakumov 1946
- Cartography: Abakumov & Čubranić 1948; DGU 1963a; DGU 1963b; Basch, Šikić & Šimunić 1972; Miklin & Šikić 1977; DGU 1997; Brkić & Čakarun 1998
- Ecology: L. 2013
- Forestry: Anić & Oršanić 2010; Posavec et al. 2020; Posavec 2020; Mihetec 2022
- Geography: Abakumov & Čubranić 1948; DGU 1963a; DGU 1963b; DGU 1997
- Geology: Basch, Šikić & Šimunić 1972; Bognar & Klein 1976; Avanić 1997a; Avanić 1997b; Kovačić 1998a; Kovačić 1998b; Radić 2020
- Geotechnics: Miklin & Šikić 1977; Ortolan 2008; Mihalinec 2011; Sokolić 2013; Bačić, Kovačević & Mihalinec 2013; Mihalić Arbanas 2013; Podolszki 2014
- History: Dobronić 1952; Ferberg Bogdan, Der-Hazarijan Vukić & Alujević 2007; Brgles 2011; Brgles 2018
- Hydrology: Brkić & Čakarun 1998
- Paleontology: Sokač 1972
- Recreation: Petković 2011; Mravunac 2015; Kičić et al. 2020; Kičić 2022; Braje & Milde 2023; Stošić 2023
- Speleology: Višek 2010; Jelić 2010
- Sport: Bušić 1998; Hemar 2013

== Bibliography ==
- Tkalčić, Ivan Krstitelj (1874). "De censibus prediorum et equitaturarum". Monumenta historica episcopatus Zagrabiensis [Historical Monuments of the Zagreb Bishopric] (in Latin). Vol. 2. pp. 43–45.
- Ivančan, Ljudevit (1902-10-28). "Crkva Svih Svetih u Stenjevcu" [The Church of All Saints in Stenjevec]. Journal of the Archaeological Museum in Zagreb (in Croatian). 6: 187–191. ISSN 0350-7165.
- Smičiklas, Tadija (1905). "Andrija kralj ugarski i hrvatski potvrdjuje na prošnju prepozita zagrebačkoga Ciriaka sve darovnice učinjene toli od kraljeva koli od inih darovatelja crkvi zagrebačkoj". Diplomatički zbornik Kraljevine Hrvatske, Dalmacije i Slavonije. Vol. 3. pp. 150–157.
- Smičiklas, Tadija (1905). "Andrija kralj ugarski i hrvatski vraća banu Ohuzu zemlju Kamešnicu pod Kalnikom, a crkvi zagrebačkoj, koja ju je dotle uživala daje u zamjenu zemlje Rodoš, Viduše, Kupuk i Braten". Diplomatički zbornik Kraljevine Hrvatske, Dalmacije i Slavonije (in Serbo-Croatian). Vol. 3. pp. 199–201.
- Kušan, Fran (1928). "Predradnje za floru lišajeva Hrvatske". Acta Botanica Croatica. 3: 1–40. ISSN 0365-0588.
- Abakumov, Nikola (1946-08-31). "Veza Astronomskog paviljona u Maksimiru sa Zagrebačkom Gorom" [A Connection of the Astronomy Pavilion in Maksimir with Zagrebačka Gora]. Geodetski List (in Croatian). 23 (3): 75–80. eISSN 1849-0611. Unused
- Abakumov, Nikolaj; Čubranić, Nikola (1948-06-30). "Bazisna mreža grada Zagreba" [Base Network of the City of Zagreb]. Geodetski List (in Croatian). 25 (5–6): 129–135. ISSN 0016-710X. Unused
- Dobronić, Lelja (1952). "Topografija zemljišnih posjeda zagrebačkog kaptola prema izvorima XIII. i XIV. stoljeća: Grmoščica" [Topography of the Land Owned by the Zagreb Chapter According to Sources of the XIII. and XIV. Centuries: Grmoščica]. Rad Jugoslavenske akademije znanosti i umjetnosti: Odjel za filozofiju i društvene nauke (in Serbo-Croatian). 3: 185–187.
- Jonke, Ljudevit (1956-01-01). "Grmoščica, Laščina, Medveščak, Peščenica ili Grmošćica. Lašćina, Medvešćak, Pešćenica?" [Grmoščica, Laščina, Medveščak, Peščenica or Grmošćica. Lašćina, Medvešćak, Pešćenica?]. Jezik: časopis za kulturu hrvatskoga književnog jezika (in Croatian). 5 (1): 30–31. eISSN 1849-174X.
- DGU (1963a). Hrvatska osnovna kartau mjerilu 1:5000 [Croatian Basic Map in the Scale 1:5000] (Map) (in Croatian). § Zagreb: 5 J 22 - 32. Partly used
- DGU (1963b). Hrvatska osnovna kartau mjerilu 1:5000 [Croatian Basic Map in the Scale 1:5000] (Map) (in Croatian). § Zagreb: 5 J 22 - 33. Partly used
- Basch, Oto; Šikić, Krešimir; Šimunić, Antun; et al. (1972). Osnovna geološka karta SFRJ [Basic Geological Map of the SFRY] (Map) (in Croatian). § Zagreb L33–80.
- Sokač, Ana (1972). Panonska i Pontska Fauna Ostrakoda Medvednice [Pannonian and Pontian Ostracode Fauna of Mt. Medvednica]. Palaeontologia Jugoslavica. Vol. 11. ISSN 0552-9352. Unused
- Bognar, Andrija; Klein, Vilko (1976-06-15). "Litostratigrafski profil pleistocenih sedimenata Grmoščice i njegovo značenje u tumačenju geomorfološkog razvoja prigorja Medvednice" [Lithostratigraphic Profile of Pleistocene Sediments in Brickyard of Grmoscica and its Importance for the Interpretation of the Geomorphologic Development of the Medvednica Foothill Area]. Hrvatski geografski glasnik (in Croatian). 38: 30–51. ISSN 1331-5854. Unused
- Miklin, Željko; Šikić, V. (1977). Osnovna inženjerskogeološka karta Republike Hrvatske 1:100.000 [Basic Engineering Map of the Republic of Croatia 1:100.000] (Map) (in Croatian). § Zagreb. Unused
- Šikić, Krešimir; Basch, Oto; Šimunić, Antun (1979). Osnovna geološka karta SFRJ 1:100.000, Tumač za list Zagreb L33–80 (PDF). Belgrade: Institut za geološka istraživanja, Zagreb.
- Avanić, Radovan (1997a). Geološka karta Republike Hrvatske 1:50 000 (Map) (in Croatian). § Klastično-karbonatni kompleks neogena Medvednice: Litostratigrafski stup Grmoščica-I. Unused
- Avanić, Radovan (1997b). Geološka karta Republike Hrvatske 1:50 000 (Map) (in Croatian). § Klastično-karbonatni kompleks neogena Medvednice: Litostratigrafski stup Grmoščica-II. Unused
- DGU (1997). Topografska karta 1:25 000 (TK25) [Topographic Map 1:25 000] (Map) (in Croatian). § Zagreb (Zapad): 4616-3-2-4. Partly used
- Matić, Slavko; Prpić, Branimir (1997). "Program njege, obnove i održavanja, te ekološke i socijalne funkcije park-šuma na području grada Zagreba" (PDF). Šumarski list. 121 (5–6): 225–242. ISSN 0373-1332.
- Bušić, Zvonimir (1998). "Šezdeset godina kuglačkog kluba Grmoščica" [Sixty Years of the Bowling Club Grmoščica]. Povijest hrvatskog športa (in Serbo-Croatian). 29 (117): 53–60. ISSN 1330-948X. Unused
- Kovačić, Marijan (1998a). Geološka karta Republike Hrvatske 1:50 000 (Map) (in Croatian). § Sedimentno-petrografske analize uzoraka s geološkog profila Grmoščica-II: Litostratigrafski stup Grmoščica-I. Unused
- Kovačić, Marijan (1998b). Geološka karta Republike Hrvatske 1:50 000 (Map) (in Croatian). § Sedimentno-petrografske analize uzoraka s geološkog profila Grmoščica-I: Litostratigrafski stup Grmoščica-II. Unused
- Brkić, Željka; Čakarun, Ivan (1998). Osnovna hidrogeološka karta Republike Hrvatske [Basic Hydrological Map of the Republic of Croatia] (Map) (in Croatian). § Zagreb. Unused
- LMK (2002). "Grmoščica". Hrvatska enciklopedija. Vol. 4. ISBN 953-6036-34-7. Unused
- Ferber Bogdan, Jasenka; Der-Hazarijan Vukić, Andreja; Alujević, Darija (2007). "Uspomene na Rudu Valdeca i prvih deset godina Umjetničke škole". Sjećanja na prve generacije Umjetničke akademije u Zagrebu. Hrvatska akademija znanosti i umjetnosti, Arhiv za likovne umjetnosti. pp. 15–119. ISBN 978-953-154-795-6.
- Ortolan, Želimir; et al. (2008). "Geotehničke okolnosti - rubni uvjet održivog razvitka "Podsljemenske urbanizirane zone"". Zbornik radova konferencije Razvitak Zagreba [Geotechnical Environment - Peripheral Condition for the Sustainable Development of the "Podsljeme Urbanised Zone"] (in Croatian). pp. 273–284. ISBN 978-953-95428-5-4. Unused
- Višek, Darko (2010-05-05). "Kako sam došao do Kustošijanke ili Kustošija ima špilju" [How I Came to the Kustošijanka or Kustošija has a Cave]. DDISKF (in Croatian).
- Jelić, Marijana (2010-05-05). "Špilja Kustošijanka" [Kustošijanka Cave]. DDISKF (in Croatian). Partly used
- Anić, Igor; Oršanić, Milan (2010). "Morfološka i šumskouzgojna obilježja park-šuma grada Zagreba" [Morphological and Silvicultural Characteristics of the Forest Parks of the City of Zagreb]. Park-šume grada Zagreba. Akademija Šumarskih Znanosti. pp. 135–146. ISBN 978-953-98571-4-9. Unused
- Petković, Iva (2011-09-22). Urbani vrtovi-urbanističko-arhitektonsko rješenje rekreacijskog parka na lokaciji Grmoščica u Zagrebu (Thesis). Zagreb: Arhitektonski fakultet Sveučilišta u Zagrebu. Unused
- Mihalinec, Zlatko (2011-10-21). Monitoring klizišta u urbanim sredinama [Monitoring of Landslides in Urban Environments] (Thesis) (in Croatian). Zagreb: Građevinski fakultet Sveučilišta u Zagrebu. Unused
- Brgles, Branimir (2010). "Toponimija na području Susedgradskog vlastelinstva u srednjovjekovnim i ranonovovjekovnim izvorima" [Toponymy of the Susedgrad manor in historical sources]. Folia onomastica Croatica (19) (published 2011-12-29): 9–36. eISSN 1848-7858.
- Koren, Toni; Hlavati, Dina; Rojko, Ivana; Zadravec, Mladen (2012-12-13). "First checklist of ladybirds (Coleoptera: Coccinellidae) of Croatia along with new faunistical records". Acta Entomologica Serbica. 17 (1–2). eISSN 2406-1581.
- Ferić, Pavle; Krkač, Martin; Mihalić, Snježana (2012). "Visual mapping of landslides from LiDAR imagery, Zagreb, Croatia". Monitoring and analyses for disaster mitigation of landslides, debris flow and floods. University of Rijeka. pp. 130–133. ISBN 978-953-6953-30-1.
- L., M. (2013-04-23). "Prirodna oaza u srcu Zagreba pretvorena u smetlište: Kada će se zaustaviti devastacija park-šume Grmoščica?". Index.hr (in Serbo-Croatian). ISSN 1849-255X. Unused
- Bačić, Mario; Kovačević, Meho Saša; Mihalinec, Zlatko (2013-07-10). "Identifikacija rizika pri monitoringu klizišta" [Risk identification in landslide monitoring]. Građevinar (in Croatian). 65 (6): 523–536. eISSN 1333-9095. Unused
- Sokolić, Željko (2013-11-15). "Klizišta – mogućnosti smanjenja šteta" [Landslide Fields - Damage Reductio Possibilities]. Politehnika I Dizajn (in Croatian). 1 (1): 49–56. doi:10.19279/TVZ.PD.2013-1-1-07. eISSN 2459-6302. Unused
- Hemar, Eduard (2013). KŠK Grmoščica: 1938 - 2013. Zagreb: Libera editio. ISBN 9789537546069. Alternate ISBN 9789535760108. Unused
- Mihalić Arbanas, Snježana; et al. (2013). "Upravljanje kriznim situacijama uslijed pokretanja klizišta" [Management of Crisis Situations After Movements in Landslide Fields]. Hrvatska platforma za smanjenje rizika od katastrofa: Zbornik radova (in Croatian). pp. 151–164. ISSN 1847-7070. Unused
- Radovanović, Vanja (2014-06-06). "Donosimo prijedloge za pet alternativnih zagrebačkih izleta". Pogledaj.to.
- Podolszki, Laszlo; et al. (2014). "Overview of historical landslide inventories of the Podsljeme Area in the City of Zagreb". Landslide and Flood Hazard Assessment: Proceedings of the 1st Regional Symposium on Landslides in the Adriatic-Balkan Region. Faculty of Mining, Geology and Petroleum Engineering of the University of Zagreb. pp. 57–62. ISBN 978-953-6923-26-7. Unused
- Mravunac, Ines (2015-07-13). Gradski park Grmoščica u Zagrebu (Thesis). Zagreb: Arhitektonski fakultet Sveučilišta u Zagrebu. Unused
- Seifter, Katharina (2015). Vorarbeiten zu einem Katalog der Flechten Kroatiens (PDF) (Thesis). Graz: Karl-Franzens-Universität.
- Guberina, Boris; Kalinić, Pavle (2016-04-11). "Critical Infrastructures Protection in the City Region of Zagreb". National Security and the Future. 17 (1–2): 135–152. eISSN 1846-1425.
- Grad Zagreb (2016). Generalni urbanistički plan Grada Zagreba: izmjene i dopune 2016. (Tekstualni dio plana, knjiga I - odredbe za provođenje) (PDF). Zagreb.
- Kapec, Davorin (2016). "Privatne šume Grada Zagreba nekad i danas". Hrvatska revija (1). eISSN 1334-2037.
- Bakrač, Koraljka (2017). "Zavod za geologiju" [Department of Geology] (PDF). Godišnje izvješće Hrvatskoga geološkog instituta (in Serbo-Croatian): 10–12. ISSN 1846-629X.
- Skuliber, Karla (2018-07-09) [defended 2018-07-03]. Korištenje javnih površina i prostorne prakse šetača pasa: primjer zagrebačke Trešnjevke (Thesis). Zagreb: Prirodoslovno-matematički fakultet Sveučilišta u Zagrebu.
- Debanić, Sandra (2018-09-05). Intermedijsko mapiranje sjećanja: pukotine i klizišta (PDF) (Thesis). Rijeka: Akademija primijenjenih umjetnosti.
- "Otvaranje radova na Grmoščici u okviru projekta URBforDAN". Grad Zagreb: Službene stranice. 2020-07-15. Unused
- Radić, Sara (2020-07-22) [defended 2020-02-26]. Mineraloške i geokemijske značajke kvartarnih pelitnih sedimenata napuštenog glinokopa Grmoščica (Zagreb) [Mineralogical and geochemical characteristics of Quaternary pelitic sediments from Grmoščica (Zagreb) abandoned clay pit] (Thesis) (in Croatian). Zagreb: Prirodoslovno-matematički fakultet Sveučilišta u Zagrebu. Unused
- Posavec, Stjepan; Šimpraga, Sergej; Matošević, Ninoslav; Dramalija, Damir; Kuzle, Izabela; Sila, Davorin (2020-11-14). "Mogućnosti razvoja integralnih planova gospodarenja urbanih šuma - primjer Grmoščica" [Possibilities for the Development of Integral Management Plans of Urban Forsts - The Example of Grmoščica]. Uloga urbanog šumarstva u održivom razvoju zelene infrastrukture u Hrvatskoj: Zbornik prezentacija (PDF) (in Croatian). Zagreb. pp. 167–175. Unused
- Posavec, Stjepan; et al. (2020-12-01). "Strateški ciljevi gospodarenja urbanim šumama grada Zagreba" [Strategic goals for urban forest management in the city of Zagreb]. Nova mehanizacija šumarstva: Časopis za teoriju i praksu šumarskoga inženjerstva. 41: 37–47. doi:10.5552/nms.2020.5. ISSN 1845-8815. Unused
- Kičić, Martina; Marin, Ana Marija; Vuletić, Dijana; Kaliger, Ivana; Matošević, Ninoslav; Šimpraga, Sergej; Krajter Ostoić, Silvija (2020-12-15). "Who Are the Visitors of Forest Park Grmoščica and What Are Their Needs? Results of Quantitative Exploratory Survey". South-East European Forestry. 11 (2): 169–180. doi:10.15177/seefor.20-19. eISSN 1849-0891. Unused
- Marušić, Marko (2021-10-25) [defended 2021-09-23]. Razvoj glavnih biciklističkih ruta u gradu Zagrebu [Development of the main bicycle routes in the City of Zagreb] (Thesis). Zagreb: Prirodoslovno-matematički fakultet Sveučilišta u Zagrebu.
- Grudiček, Dominik (2021-11-23) [2021-10-15]. Vrbe (Salix spp.) u zbirkama Herbarium Croaticum i Herbarij Ive i Marije Horvat (Thesis). Zagreb: Prirodoslovno-matematički fakultet Sveučilišta u Zagrebu.
- Balić, Anđela (2021-12-12). Održivi oblici prometa i javne zelene površine kao element urbane održivosti na primjeru grada Zagreba [Sustainable forms of transport and public green spaces as an element of urban sustainability on the example of the city of Zagreb] (Thesis). Zagreb: Filozofski fakultet Sveučilišta u Zagrebu.
- Mihetec, Zvonimir (2022-10-28) [defended 2022-09-30]. Obilježja i uloge park-šuma Grada Zagreba [Characteristics and functions of the park-forests of the city of Zagreb] (Thesis). Zagreb: Agronomski fakultet Sveučilišta u Zagrebu. Unused
- Kičić, Martina (2022-11-25). Kvantitativna procjena i kartiranje percepcije kulturoloških usluga i negativnosti zelene infrastrukture grada Zagreba [Quantitative assessment and mapping of perception of cultural ecosystem services and disservices of urban green infrastructure in the city of Zagreb] (Thesis). Zagreb: Fakultet šumarstva i drvne tehnologije Sveučilišta u Zagrebu. Unused
- Braje, Ivan; Milde, Antonio (2023-07-20). "Measurement and Analysis of the Air Interface of 4G and 5G Mobile Networks on ICT Green Routes for Recreation in Zagreb". Politehnika I Dizajn. 11 (2): 85–94. doi:10.19279/TVZ.PD.2023-11-2-12. eISSN 2459-6302. Unused
- Stošić, Ivan (2023-09-28) [defended 2023-09-26]. Mogućnost povezivanja park šume Grmoščica i Jarunskog jezera revitalizacijom trase potoka Kustošak [The possibility of connecting the Grmoščica park forest and Lake Jarun through the revitalization of the Kustošak stream route] (Thesis). Agronomski fakultet Sveučilišta u Zagrebu. Unused
- Marunić, Bartul (2024-03-18) [defended 2024-02-22]. Sanacija napuštenih površinskih kopova [Reclmation of abandoned surface mines] (Thesis). Rudarsko-geološko-naftni fakultet Sveučilišta u Zagrebu.
- Krsnik, Goran (2024-10-05). "Is Zagreb Green Enough? Influence of Urban Green Spaces on Mitigation of Urban Heat Island: A Satellite-Based Study". Earth. 5 (4): 604–622. doi:10.3390/earth5040031. eISSN 2673-4834.
- Lebo, Željko (2025-01-21) [defended 2024-12-19]. Krutost i čvrstoća zagrebačke gline poboljšane raznim vezivima [Stiffness and strength of zagreb clay improved with different binders] (Thesis) (in Serbo-Croatian). Zagreb: Građevinski fakultet Sveučilišta u Zagrebu.
