= Stephen of Cuneo =

Saint Stephen of Cuneo
- Born: Stefano da Cueno c. 1340; Cuneo, Kingdom of Sardinia
- Died: November 14, 1391; Jerusalem
- Cause of death: tortured to death by Muslims
- Honored in: Catholic Church
- Beatified: June 12, 1966, St. Peter's Basilica, Vatican City by Pope Paul VI
- Canonized: June 21, 1970, St. Peter's Basilica, Vatican City by Pope Paul VI
- Feast: November 14,
- Attributes: religious habit

Saint Stephen of Cuneo (also known as St. Stefano da Cueno) ( c. 1340 - November 14, 1391) was a 14th century Italian Franciscan friar and monk from Cuneo, Kingdom of Sardinia (modern-day Piedmont, Italy), who was one of Nicholas Tavelic's companions who was executed alongside him in Jerusalem by Muslims trying to convert him. They were canonzied as saints on June 21, 1970, by Pope Paul VI.

== Biography ==
Born in Cuneo, Kingdom of Sardinia, little is known about Stephen's early years, However he was likely born to the Prunelli family in the year 1340. He received a master's degree in theology, became a Franciscan priest in Genoa and lived for eight years as a monk in the vicarage of Corsica.

In 1383, Stephen was sent to Jerusalem to aid in Nicholas Tavelic's effort to convert Muslims in Jerusalem. Stephen and Nicholas preached to the locals with the aid of their companions Deodatus Aribert of Rodez and Peter of Narbonne. On November 11, 1391, they were taken before the qadi and was asked to renounce his faith but refused and were ordered to be executed. On November 14, 1391, the men were asked once again to renounce their faith but refused and they were executed by being torn apart and had their remains burned so they could not be venerated.

== Beatification and Canonziation ==
In 1889, Nicholas Tavelic was beatified by Pope Leo XIII. Later Stephen, Deodatus and Peter were beatified by Pope Paul VI on June 12, 1966, and later canonized on June 21, 1970, also by Pope Paul VI.
