= Krvavi Most =

Street in Zagreb, Croatia

Coordinates: 45°48′53″N 15°58′33″E

Krvavi most
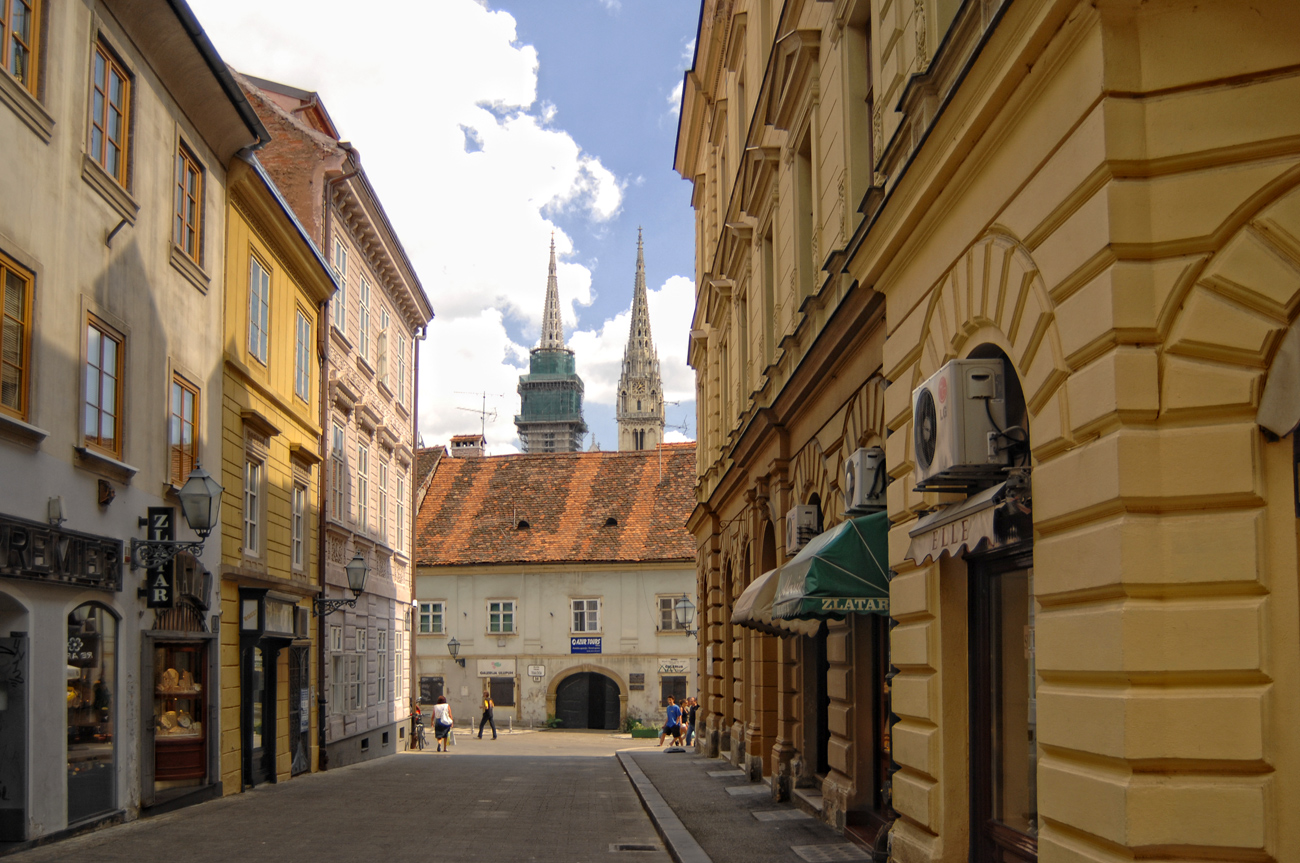
- Bloody bridge with Zagreb Cathedral in the distance
- Length: 0.3 km (0.19 mi)
- From: Radićeva ulica
- To: Tkalčićeva Street

Krvavi most (lit. "Bloody Bridge") is a street in the heart of Zagreb, capital of Croatia. It is named after the former bridge over the Medveščak creek, which was rendered useless after the covering of the creek. Although the bridge became the street, the name stayed because of historical reasons – as a reminder of history and a witness of Zagreb's past.

The bridge gained its name because of the constant conflicts happening on its wooden beams between the citizens of the two parts of Zagreb: Gradec and present day Kaptol.

== History ==
The bridge was named after the constant conflicts on its wooden beams between the citizens of Kaptol and Gradec. The name Krvavi most (Bloody Bridge) first appears in historical records in 1667, when a battle took place on November 17. These conflicts began in the 14th century, and peace was achieved between the warring parties in the 18th century. One of the deadliest fights occurred at the end of the 14th century on the bridge that connected two banks of Medveščak creek. According to the legend, the amount of the blood spilled caused the creek to turn red and thus the name of the bridge came to be. The citizens of Kaptol and Gradec built the bridge and turned it into a permanent road from the Upper town walls with the Stone Gate to the Kaptol Gate in today's Skalinska Street. This bridge connected the city municipality with Zagreb in Kaptol.

Due to the development of industry, pollution occurred, which forced the city authorities to introduce a sewage system. This intervention led to the closure of the Medveščak stream and the final demolition of the bridge in 1899.

== In popular culture ==
- Marija Jurić Zagorka wrote a novel series in the name of Grička vještica in 1912. The first novel is about the bridge called: "Tajna krvavog mosta" (The secret of Bloody Bridge).
- Dubravko Horvatić wrote a legend that is part of the collection of legends Grički top i druge legende.
- Mirko Bogović is the author of the short story Krvavi most u Zagrebu.
- In 1887 a local businessman established the first telephone exchange there.

== Sources ==
- "Krvavi most". zagreb.hr (in Croatian). City of Zagreb.
