= Nicholas Tavelic =

Croatian Franciscan friar, martyr and Catholic saint

Saint Nicholas Tavelic, O.F.M
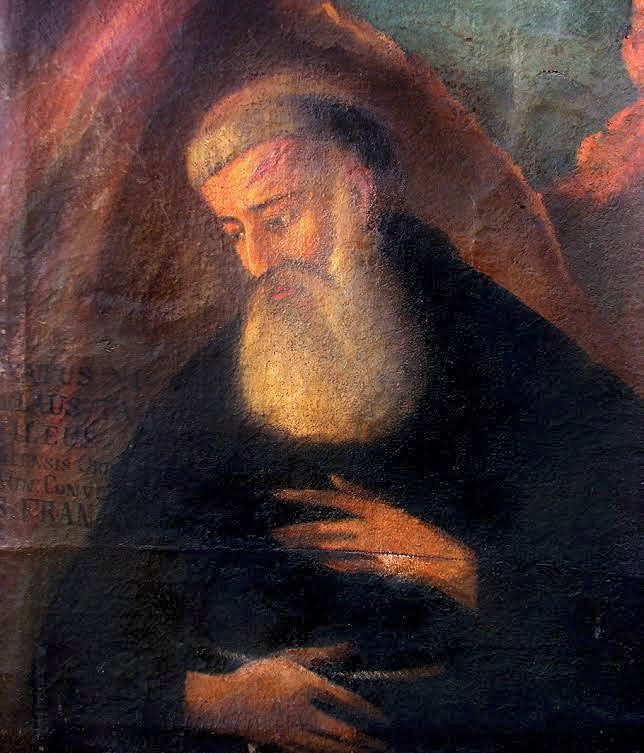
- Portrait of Tavelić from ca. 1500

Religious, Priest and Martyr
- Born: c. 1340 probably Šibenik, Kingdom of Croatia and Dalmatia
- Died: November 14, 1391; Jerusalem, Mamluk Sultanate
- Venerated in: Catholic Church (Croatia & Franciscan Order)
- Beatified: 1889, Saint Peter's Basilica, Rome, Papal States, by Pope Leo XIII
- Canonized: June 21, 1970, Saint Peter's Basilica, Vatican City, by Pope Paul VI
- Major shrine: Croatian National Shrine of St. Nicholas Tavelic in Šibenik, Croatia
- Feast: November 14 (Tavelićevo)

Nicholas Tavelic, O.F.M. (Croatian: Nikola Tavelić), was a Croatian Friar Minor, priest and missionary who was the leader of a group of friars who died a martyr's death in Jerusalem on November 14, 1391. He was beatified along with his companions, who included friars from Italy and France. All four members of his group have since been declared saints by the Catholic Church, making Tavelic the first canonized Croatian saint.

== Life ==
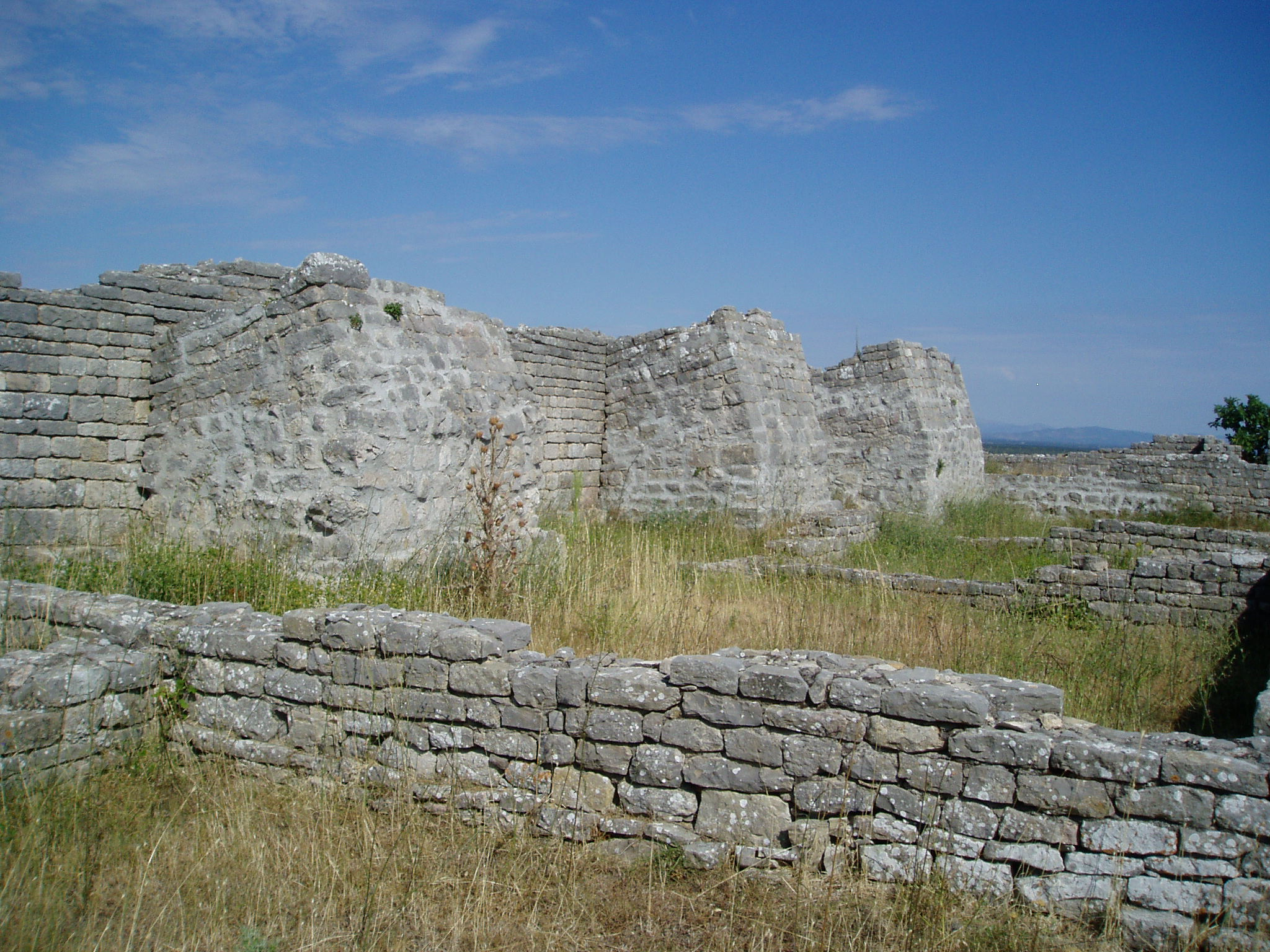
Ruins of church and Franciscan monastery of St. Mary in Bribir, where Tavelic became a monk.

Most sources mention Šibenik as Tavelic's birthplace, but another possible location is Velim near Stankovci. He is considered to originate from a noble family. In 1365, Tavelic became a friar in Bribir, the seat of the Šubić, a powerful Croatian noble family.

Tavelic was among 60 friars from various Franciscan provinces who answered an appeal by the Bosnian guardian, motivated by a papal bull, Prae cunctis, issued in 1291 by Pope Nicholas IV, himself a Friar Minor, to work as missionaries in Bosnia, combating the perceived heresies of the Bosnian Church. Tavelic spread Catholicism around Bosnia for 12 years. In his report to the pope, the Bosnian guardian later said that the missionaries converted around 50,000 members of that Church.

In 1383, Tavelic went to serve in the Custody of the Holy Land where he met the friars Deodatus Aribert of Rodez, Peter of Narbonne and Stephen of Cuneo. The four lived at the Monastery of Mount Zion, the ancient friary maintained by the Friars Minor in the city, where they spent several years learning Arabic and serving at the holy sites connected to Jesus' life, which had been entrusted to the care of the Order of Friars Minor and which still drew pilgrims from Christian Europe.

After having seen few, if any, conversions from the Muslim populace of the city resulting from their quiet pastoral work at the holy sites of Christianity, Tavelic and his colleagues decided to take the option given to them in the Rule of Life of their founder, Francis of Assisi, and to preach openly the Christian faith to the Muslim populace. They went to the regular gathering before the Qadi of Jerusalem and began to preach. Following their arrest for this, they refused the option to convert to Islam and were imprisoned. After again refusing to convert several days later, the group were all sentenced to death. These missionaries were executed near the Jaffa Gate on November 14, 1391, and their remains completely burned.

== Veneration ==
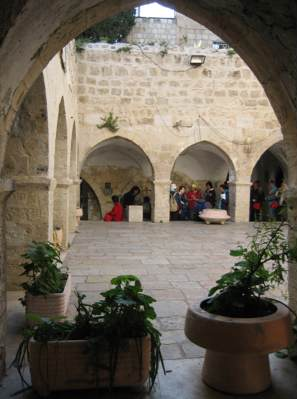
The courtyard of the former Mount Zion Monastery of the Franciscan friars in Jerusalem, where St. Nikola lived.

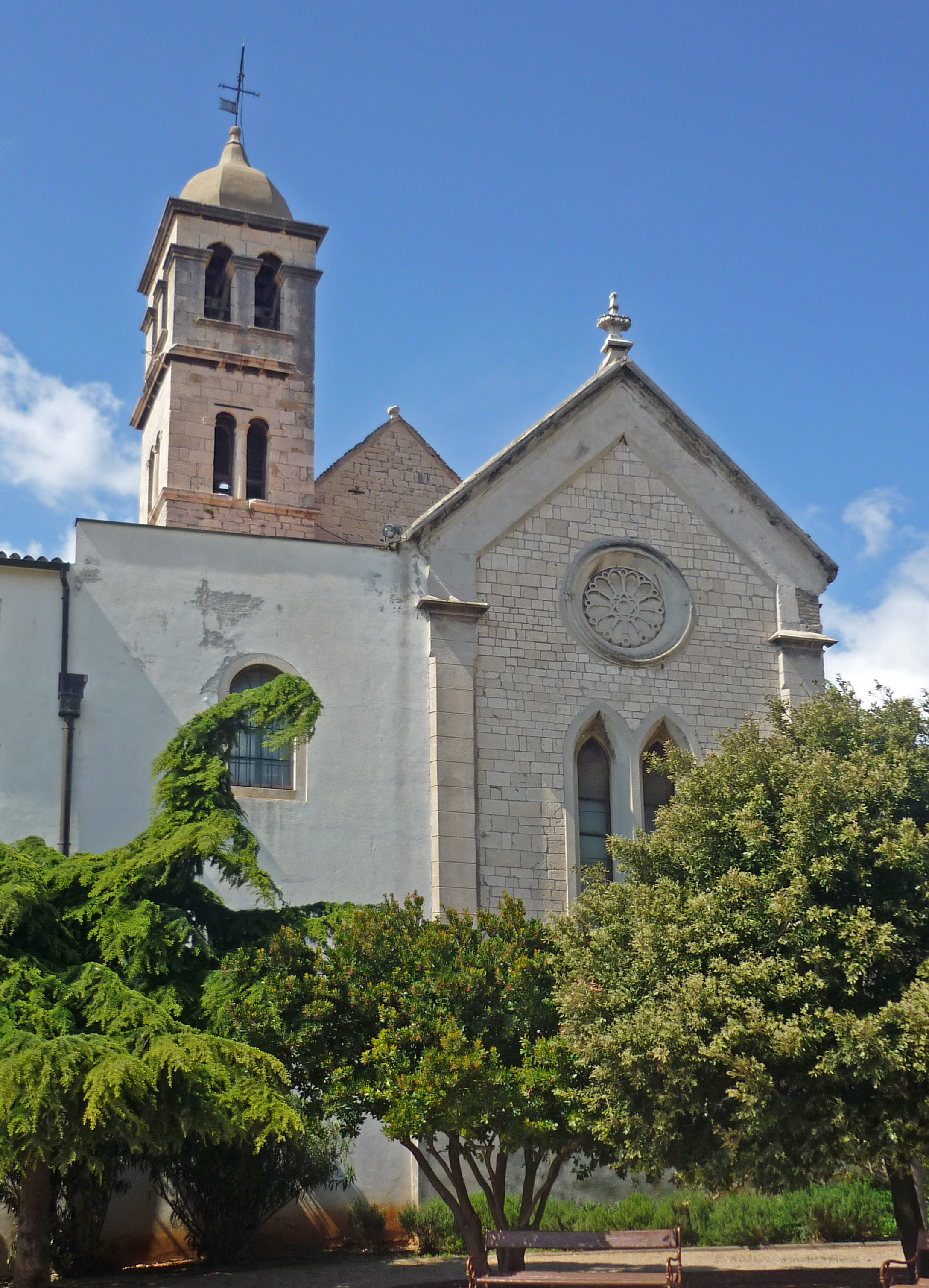
Croatian National Shrine of St. Nicholas Tavelic in Šibenik.

Friar Gerard Chalvet, O.F.M., was the guardian of the Jerusalem friary and witnessed their executions. Together with Friar Martin of Šibenik, he sent a detailed report to Europe: the pope, Leipzig, Šibenik and elsewhere. Tavelic and his companions were soon celebrated as martyrs by Franciscans all over Europe, especially in Šibenik.

Five centuries later, in 1880, Antun Josip Fosco, the Bishop of the Diocese of Šibenik, started the procedure for the Holy See for the formal beatification of Tavelic. By a special decree, Pope Leo XIII recognized his ancient cultus for the Šibenik Diocese in 1889 and for the entire Franciscan Order in 1898. Two years later, the same thing was done for the Holy Land.

The cult of the friars, especially that of Tavelic, grew between the World Wars. The cultus of the other three martyrs was recognized by Pope Paul VI in 1966, with a separate feast day of 17 November. The four friars were canonized together by Pope Paul VI in front of 20,000 Croats in Vatican City, on June 21, 1970, with their conjoined feast day being 14 November.

There is Croatian National Shrine of St. Nicholas Tavelic in Franciscan monastery and St. Francis church in Šibenik, Croatia.

His feast day in Croatian is known as Tavelićevo ("Tavelić's day").

== Churches ==
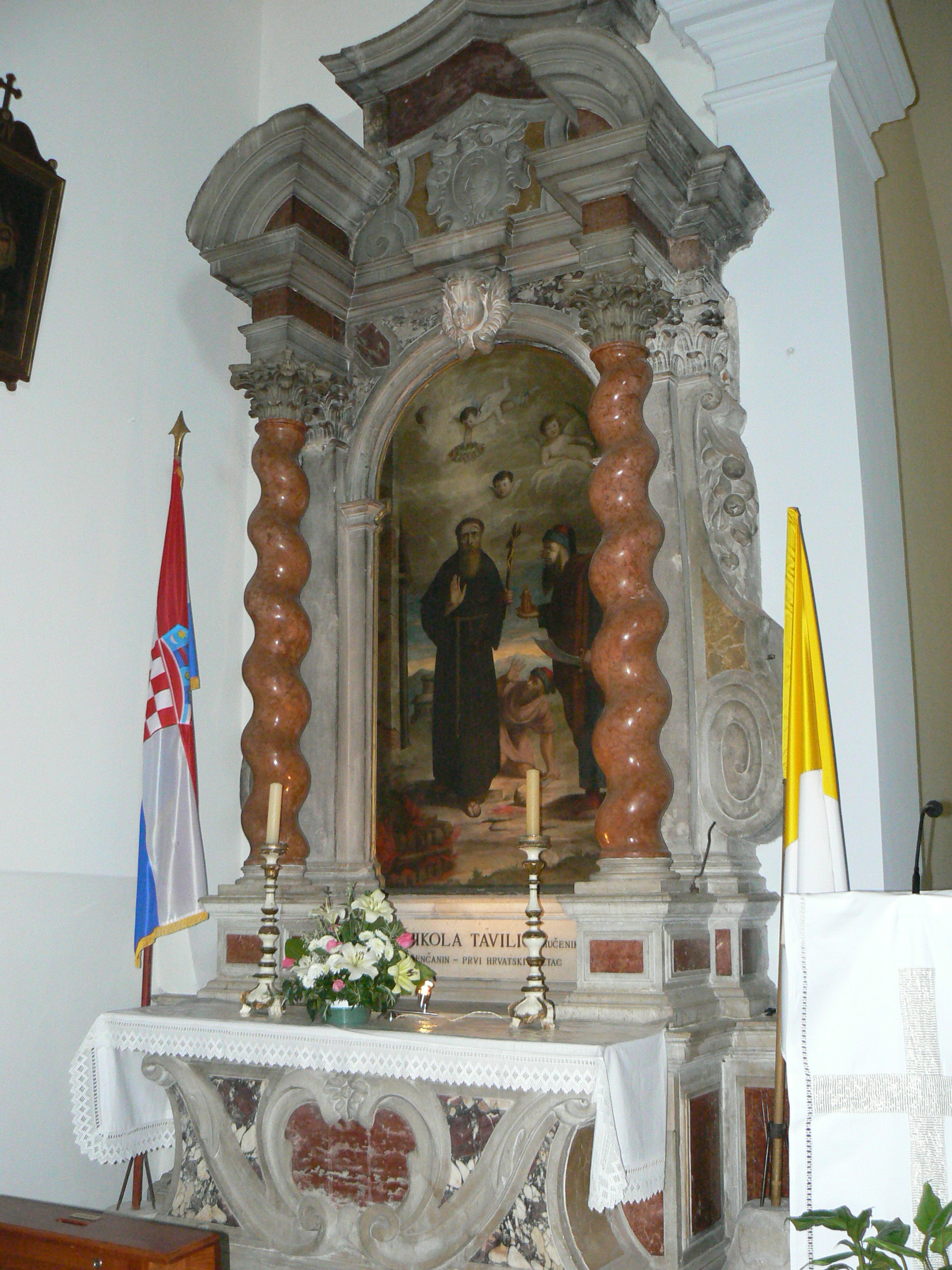
Side-altar dedicated to Saint Nicholas Tavelic in the Franciscan Church of Šibenik, Croatia.

First Catholic parish and parish church consecrated to Tavelić in Croatia was in Zagreb's neighbourhood Kustošija. Parish was established on 29 June 1939 and foundation stone for a church was consecrated by auxiliary bishop of Zagreb Josip Lach on 16 November 1941. Church was consecrated by archbishop Alojzije Stepinac on 14 November 1943.

First church consercration to Tavelić out of Croatia was one in Bezdanski put near Sombor on 14 November 1971.

Most churches dedicated to Tavelić are located in Croatia. Some of them are in Banjevci, Cerovac, Lišani, Perković, Split, Vinjani, Zagreb, Rijeka and Županja. Churches abroad can be found in Hurlingham, Buenos Aires in Argentina, Montreal and Winnipeg in Canada, Melbourne and Sydney in Australia and Tomislavgrad in Bosnia-Herzegovina

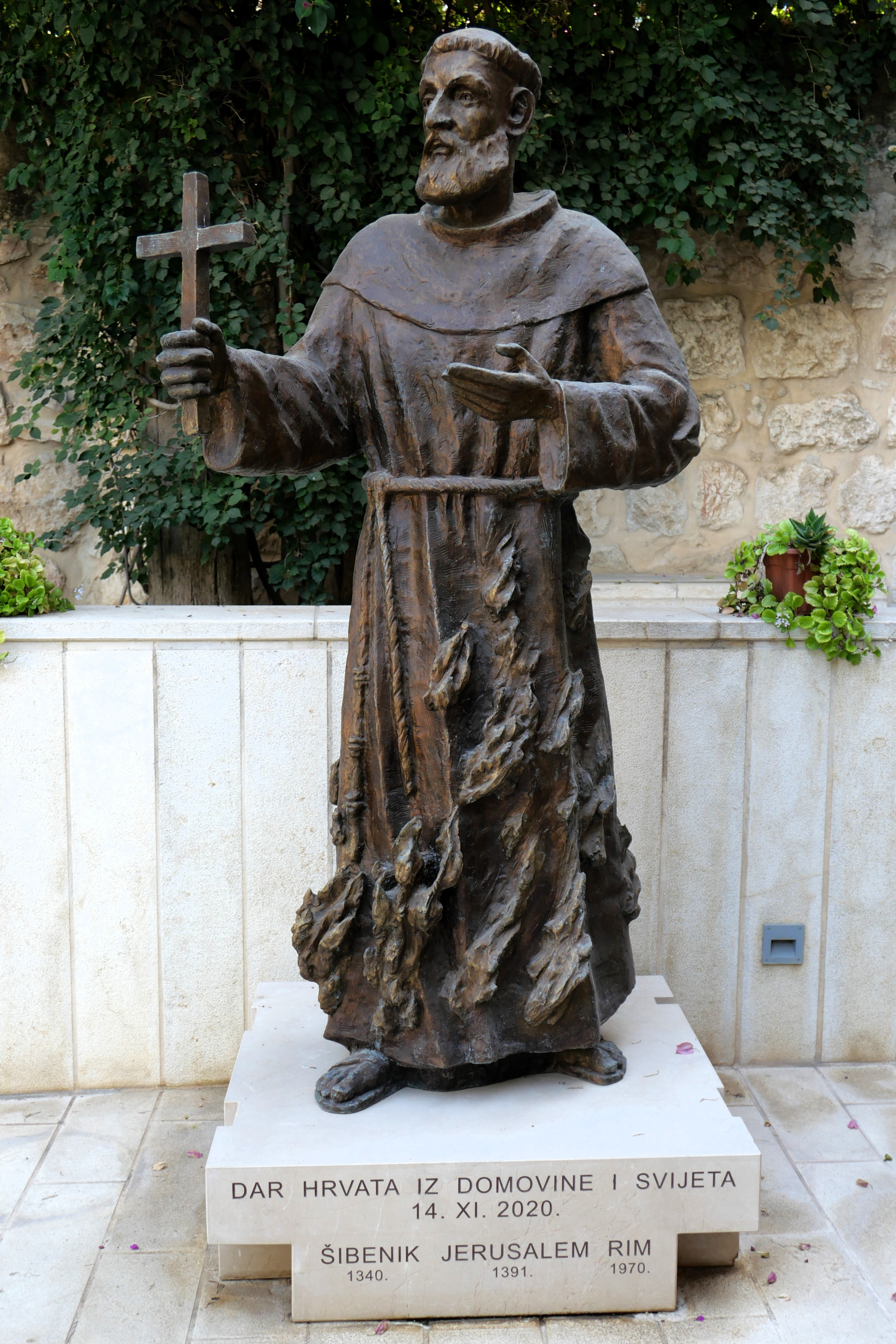
Statue of St. Nikola Tavelić at the Franciscan Ad Coenaculum Monastery in Mount Zion, Jerusalem. A gift of Croats from the homeland and the world in 2020.
