= Medveščak (stream) =

River in Croatia

Coordinates: 45°48′53″N 15°58′33″E

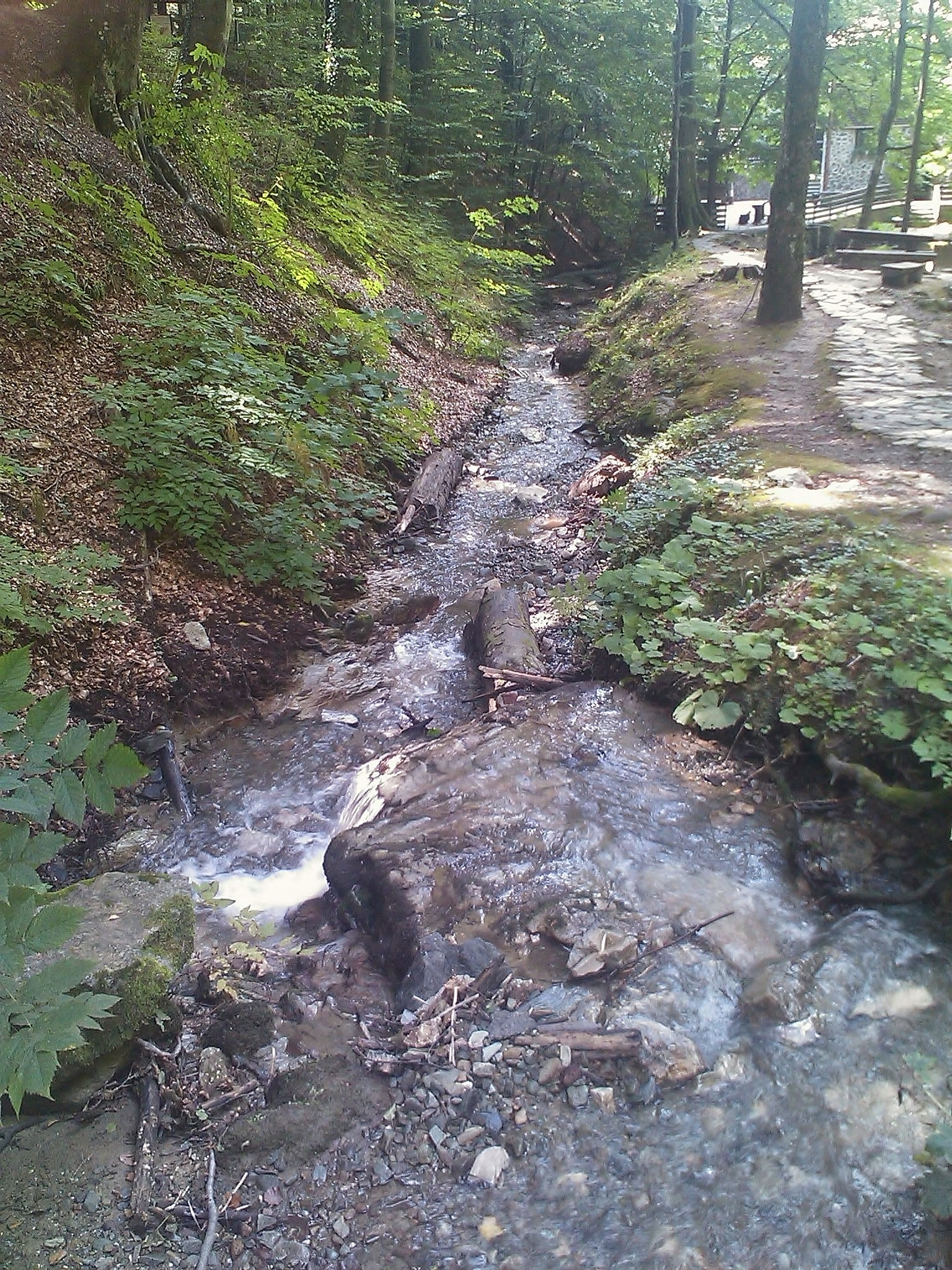
Near its source at Kraljičin zdenac

Medveščak (pronounced [medʋeʃtʃǎːk], also called Crikvenik) is a creek in central Zagreb, Croatia. It flows from Kraljičin zdenac in Podsljeme down along the southern slopes of the Medvednica mountain to the Manduševac Fountain, its mouth. The creek was covered in 1898 and today forms part of the Zagreb sewer system. Medveščak has long served as an important geographical feature of historic Zagreb, delineating the border between the often warring twin cities of Gradec (Gornji Grad) and Kaptol between the 11th and the 19th century and causing many violent floods which often decimated houses on its banks. Most of the stream is located in the Gornji Grad - Medveščak city district, running underground under Tkalčićeva and Medvedgradska Streets.

The creek today plays a minor role in the Zagreb sewer system, having ceased powering the Manduševac Fountain in 1882. However, it gave its name to the Medveščak neighborhood.

== Description ==
The stream's source is located on the Medvednica mountain, near Kraljičin zdenac. Therefrom it flows through a flood retention dam near the Šestinski Lagvić restaurant, and onwards through the neighbourhood of Mlinovi (Croatian for "mills") in a concrete basin. It has a confluence with Gračanec stream near Okrugljak, which used to be responsible for a large part of its downstream water flow, and continues to Medveščak, where it joins the city's sewage system.

== History ==
The banks of Medveščak stream have been inhabited since antiquity. Roman coins spanning the time from Germanicus (1st century BC/AD) to Crispus (early 4th century AD) have been found in Medveščak's riverbed near Vlaška Street.

One of today's best known roles of Medveščak is as the border between the two cores of modern downtown Zagreb, Gradec and Kaptol. The two cities often had disputes about the creek's sovereignty and the ownership of mills built on it. One of the relics remaining as the evidence of these tumultuous times is the Krvavi Most, a former bridge and currently a very short street in the Zagreb pedestrian zone, whose name literally means "Bloody Bridge." It has been the site of several battles between the twin cities.

Medveščak has been the center of Zagreb industry since the early days of the city, spawning numerous watermills. The watermills caused the development of Zagreb industry, easing the construction of Zagreb's first cloth, soap, paper and liquor factories and later animal skin industry. The watermills were often the subject of feuds between the twin cities, Kaptol and Gradec. A 1392 peace treaty forbade construction of new watermills along the shared city border, between today's southern end of Medvedgradska Street and Ban Jelačić Square, leaving only two mills within the city. Both mills were owned by a Cistercian monastery. However, they were both razed during the 1898 covering of the creek.

The creek often produced catastrophic floods until 1898, at which time it was covered by the Creek Road (Croatian: Ulica Potok, today Tkalčićeva Street) and became part of the new sewer system. The most tragic flood was the one in 1651, when 52 people were confirmed to have drowned in the creek. The creek thus earned the name "Krvavi Potok" ("Bloody creek"), as described by the notable Zagreb historian Baltazar Adam Krčelić in his work Annuae.

== See also ==
- List of streams in Zagreb
