= Lauba =

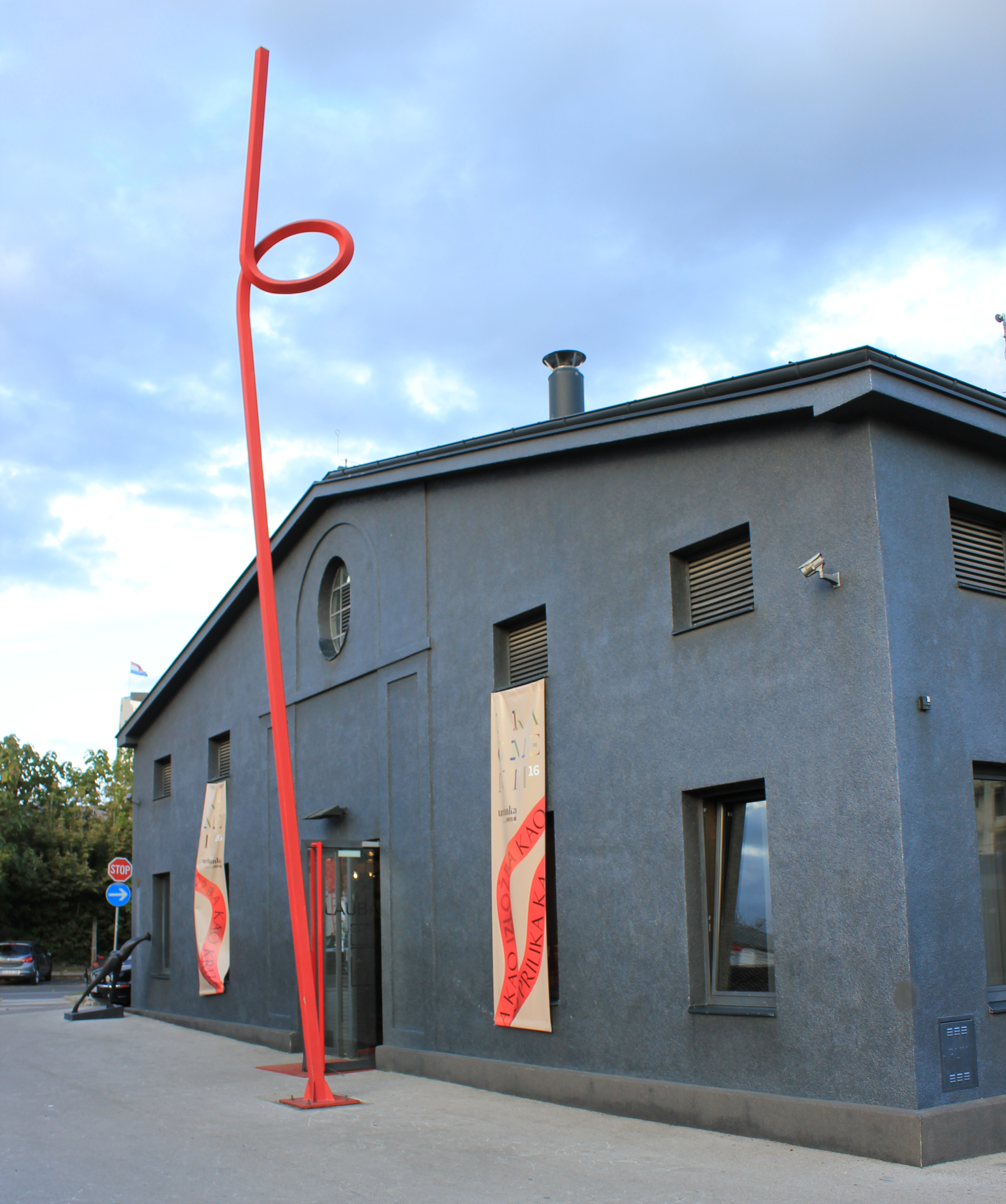
- Established: 14 June 2011; 15 years ago
- Location: Zagreb, Croatia
- Coordinates: 45°48′41″N 15°56′25″E
- Type: Contemporary art gallery
- Curator: Vanja Žanko
- Website: www.lauba.hr/en/

Lauba is a private-owned contemporary art gallery in the Črnomerec district of Zagreb, Croatia. It houses exhibits from the Lauba collection, a large private collection of works by modern and postmodern Croatian artists. The venue is also used for exhibitions of foreign contemporary artists and for hosting various arts-related events.

== Name and concept ==
The word Lauba comes from a game based around a circular avenue of trees, called a Lauba and it was coined in the minds of a few boys who spent their childhood days in Vrbovec. The aim was to run the entire Lauba without touching the ground. We can probably find its origin in the German word laub, which means leaves. The name was chosen for its personal resonance to the owner of the Filip Trade Collection.

Lauba House is one of the first private spaces on its scale for the display of visual art. The exhibition hall is 1350 m². Although housing the Filip Trade Collection, the space and its organisation do not wish to be limited to the roles of museum or gallery, aiming to initiate international exhibitions and artistic concepts.

== Architecture ==
In January 2007 there was an architectural competition by invitation for Lauba House. In March 2007, the project by AGP Design was selected. The winning project best devised a solution to the harmonious coexistence of business, with the Filip Trade offices, and the art activities of the exhibition space. The solution was found in an interpolated elongated cube of offices raised on columns, which stretches along the south side of the exhibition space.

The project was realized with modest and minimal resources just enough to clean out the building and return it to its state. Guided by the motto “back to basics”, the valuable historical layers of the building were preserved. For example, the interior brick walls were cleaned and given a protective transparent coating which allows for the “reading” of every phase of the building's history. The position of the former weaving mill floor has thus remained visible, as well as the swollen eastern wall which had almost collapsed after the demolition of the attached building. There are numerous similar details consistently implemented throughout the space, giving it the impression of “a frozen construction site”. The inserted cube, on the other hand, is a high-tech contemporary interpolation covered with black glass.

Architect Morana Vlahović gave the final touch to the building by painting the exterior all in black. In accordance with conservators this was the only change implemented in order to associate the building's appearance with the contemporary objects inside.

== Conservation ==
The Lauba House is a building that once served as the TKZ (Zagreb Textile Mill) weaving mill, which now has the status of a protected cultural monument. Around it were factory halls, historically significant for the national textile industry, which had been manufacturing top quality damask ever since 1923. The hall was initially built as a riding arena within the Austro-Hungarian Cavalry Barracks. Emil Eisner and Adolf Ehrlich, the leading construction company in Zagreb, designed it in 1910. The barracks were situated on more than 20 000 square meters of land, including a building for the brigadier officer school team, a smithy, horse stalls and the riding arena. Lauba House has become the first example of a successful cultural heritage reconstruction in the western part of Zagreb.

== Interior ==
Given that the building has no storage space architect Morana Vlahović developed a new way of exhibiting contemporary art works. Due to its status as a protected cultural monument, no digging was allowed beneath the floor level of the building. Therefore, the depot needs to function inside and together with the exhibition space. The architect came up with aluminium panels which replace the exhibition walls. Each panel is 5 meters wide and 3.5 meters high, with each divided into a 3 meter wide solid part, and 2 meter wide thick wire mesh. The panels are moveable and so it is possible to switch from a completely open space to a dense maze of panels.

== Exhibitions ==
During its first few years, Lauba intends to present works from the Filip Trade Collection and current art production. The concept is called a Non-permanent exhibition as some of its segments will change on a monthly basis and thus continually offer the possibility of interpreting new stories.

During each sequence of the Non-permanent exhibition concept, there are parallel exhibitions and events, which will together form an interactive Lauba program. The difference between permanent displays and temporary exhibitions are not polarised, they are set up side by side and are mutually complementary.
