= Kuniščak =

Stream in Zagreb, Croatia

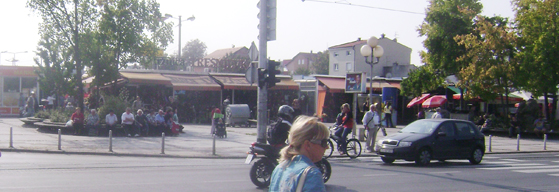
Kuniščak today flows underground below the Trešnjevka Square

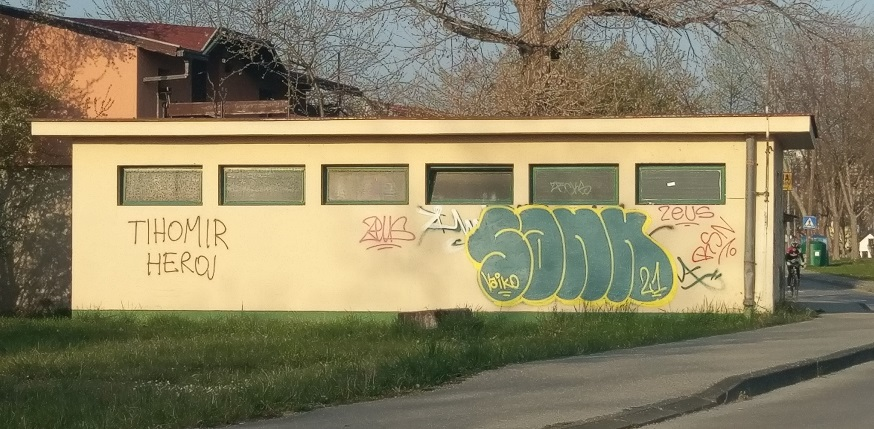
Building of the Kuniščak dam at the River Sava in Trnje

Kuniščak is a torrential stream in Zagreb, Croatia. It emerges on the foothills of Medvednica Mountain and flows south through the city into the River Sava. Earlier in Zagreb's history, Kuniščak was the location of flour mills, which came under control of Zagreb millers' and bakers' corporation (Croatian: ceh) in early 19th century. In mid-20th century, most of the stream was placed underground, covered by streets and walkways, including Kuniščak street, Krapinska Street, Trešnjevka Square and Yuri Gagarin Promenade. Kuniščak used to drain into Sava through the Savica meander in the area of modern-day Trnjanska Savica and Folnegovićevo naselje until the construction of the embankments following the 1964 Zagreb flood, when Savica was artificially cut off from the river, becoming an oxbow lake.

Part of Zagreb's flood defences, the upper course is channelled through the Kuniščak retention basin, which retards torrential flow downstream during rainstorms, while the lower course of Kuniščak collects water from many other Zagreb streams, ending in a dammed outlet into Sava which was constructed some time after 1977. During the 2020 Zagreb flash flood, the Kuniščak dam was unstaffed and closed, causing storm water to pool in the city. Residents of nearby houses broke into the dam control building to open the dam themselves, releasing floodwaters into Sava. A controversy ensued over who was responsible for this failure of flood defences.
