= Kustošak =

Stream in Croatia

Kustošak is a stream passing through the neighbourhoods of Kustošija and Trešnjevka in Zagreb, Croatia. It is located on the western part of Medvednica Mountain's southern slope. The stream's upper basin is not easily accessible due to suburban development, but public walkways have been built along its lower basin. Before the urbanisation of Trešnjevka, Kustošak used to flow directly into Sava River, but due to the river's meandering only a sharp remains of the stream's former mouth. Further downstream, Kustošak discharges into the Vrapčak stream. Parts of the stream were covered in the course of the city's expansion, and several retention basins have been built.

In May 2013 and March 2014, the stream was polluted by a fluorescent green liquid, which caused a dying of frogs. The authorities determined that the cause of the 2013 discoloration was deliberate waste dumping. The stream is listed as having category II water quality. It is also classified as a water flow with a protective corridor.

== See also ==
- List of streams of Zagreb
