= Gornji Čehi =

- Village
- Location within Croatia
- Coordinates: 45°44′39″N 15°57′30″E
- Country: Croatia
- County: City of Zagreb

Area
  - Total: 0.81 sq mi (2.1 km^{2})
- Elevation: 374 ft (114 m)

Population (2021)
  - Total: 368
  - Density: 450/sq mi (180/km^{2})
- Time zone: UTC+1 (CET)
  - Summer (DST): UTC+2 (CEST)

Gornji Čehi is a village in Croatia. It is formally a settlement (naselje) of Zagreb, the capital of Croatia.

== Demographics ==
According to the 2021 census, its population was 368. According to the 2011 census, it had 363 inhabitants.
