= Desprim =

- Village
- Location within Croatia
- Coordinates: 45°43′32″N 15°54′02″E
- Country: Croatia
- County: City of Zagreb

Area
  - Total: 0.19 sq mi (0.5 km^{2})
- Elevation: 390 ft (119 m)

Population (2021)
  - Total: 343
  - Density: 1,800/sq mi (690/km^{2})
- Time zone: UTC+1 (CET)
  - Summer (DST): UTC+2 (CEST)

Desprim is a village in Croatia. It is formally a settlement (naselje) of Zagreb, the capital of Croatia.

== Demographics ==
According to the 2021 census, its population was 343. According to the 2011 census, it had 377 inhabitants.
