= Drenčec =

- Village
- Location within Croatia
- Coordinates: 45°50′18″N 16°12′16″E
- Country: Croatia
- County: City of Zagreb

Area
  - Total: 0.81 sq mi (2.1 km^{2})
- Elevation: 377 ft (115 m)

Population (2021)
  - Total: 136
  - Density: 170/sq mi (65/km^{2})
- Time zone: UTC+1 (CET)
  - Summer (DST): UTC+2 (CEST)

Drenčec is a village in Croatia. It is formally a settlement (naselje) of Zagreb, the national capital. In the 2021 census, its population is 136, up from 131 in 2011.
