= Jadranska Avenue =

Road in Zagreb, Croatia

Coordinates: 45°45′57″N 15°55′10″E

Jadranska Avenue

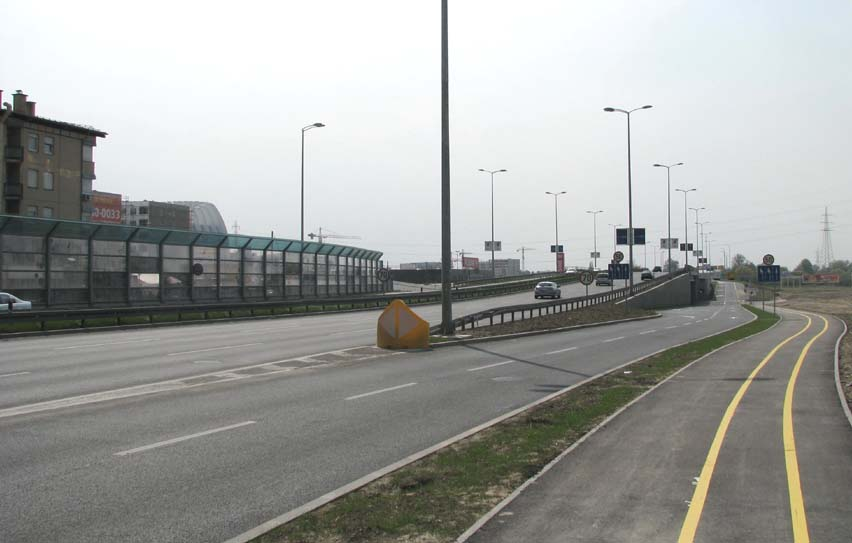

Route information
- Maintained by Zagrebačke ceste d.d.
- Length: 5.5 km (3.4 mi)
- Existed: 1970–present

Major junctions
- East end: Remetinec Roundabout in western Novi Zagreb
- Lanište Street in Lanište accessway towards Blato, Botinec and Remetinec (at-grade) Karlovačka Road near Lučko
- West end: A1 and A3 at the Lučko interchange

Location
- Country: Croatia
- Major cities: City of Zagreb

Highway system
- Highways in Croatia

Jadranska Avenue (Croatian: Jadranska avenija, literally: Adriatic Avenue) is a mostly six-lane controlled-access avenue in the Novi Zagreb – zapad city district of southwestern Zagreb, Croatia. Legally designated as a part of County road Ž1040, it runs between the Remetinec Roundabout and the Zagreb bypass, acting as an important thoroughfare both for commuters from southwestern suburbs of Lučko and Stupnik and for travellers coming to the city by A1 motorway. The avenue experiences high amounts of seasonal traffic in summer resulting in traffic jams sometimes spanning the whole length of the avenue. The daily traffic has also been rising in recent years due to former bedroom communities in Zagreb County from the 1990s becoming new outer suburbs in the 2000s. Novi Zagreb neighborhoods Blato, Botinec and Lanište are located directly south of the avenue. The intersection with Lanište Road was recently converted into an interchange.

== Route description ==
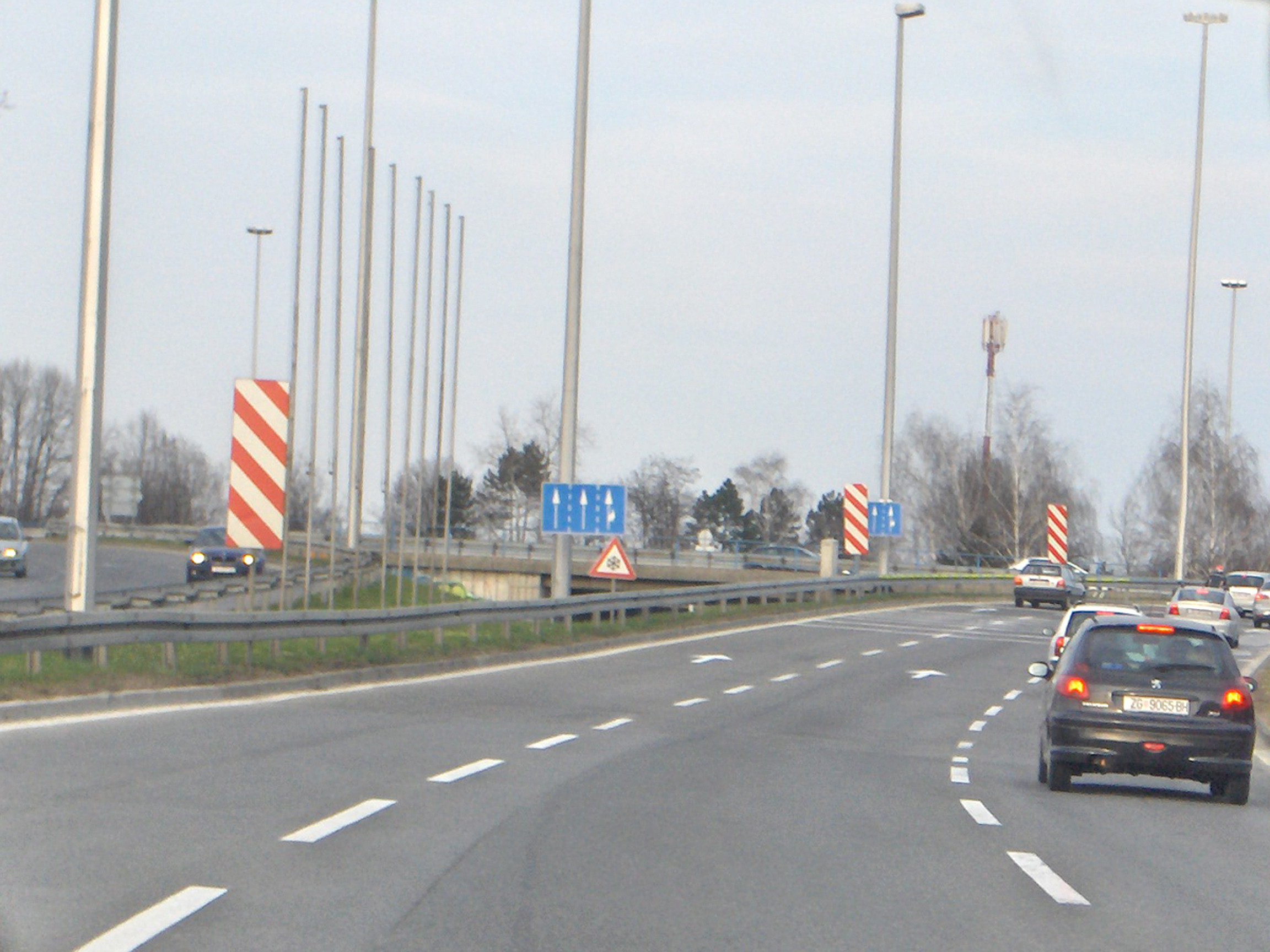
Jadranska Avenue, the approach toward the Remetinec Roundabout

The primary entrance to the six-lane Jadranska Avenue is through the Remetinec Roundabout. The three- to four-lane roundabout receives traffic from the grade-separated Adriatic Bridge accessway in the north, the Dubrovnik Avenue from the east, and the Remetinec Road in the south. Jadranska Avenue is also accessible from the nearby neighbourhood of Kajzerica through a westbound one-way ramp, located near the local Spar supermarket and McDonald's restaurant, which in turn are accessible from the nearby surface streets to the north which can be accessed by the means of RIRO interchanges on the bridge accessway.

Jadranska Avenue continues by lightly curving in a southwest direction away from the center of Novi Zagreb. Noise barriers are installed alongside the avenue, on the south side between the Remetinec Roundabout and Lanište Street interchange. Approximately 800 meters (0.5 mi) from the eastern terminus, the avenue intersects Lanište Street at a diamond interchange. The four-lane street continues south to provide access to the neighborhood of Lanište, the Remetinečki Gaj Street, and Arena Zagreb. The northern leg of this interchange has not been built as of 2011, as the northward extension would have to cross the river Sava towards Jarun, so it functions more as a trumpet interchange.

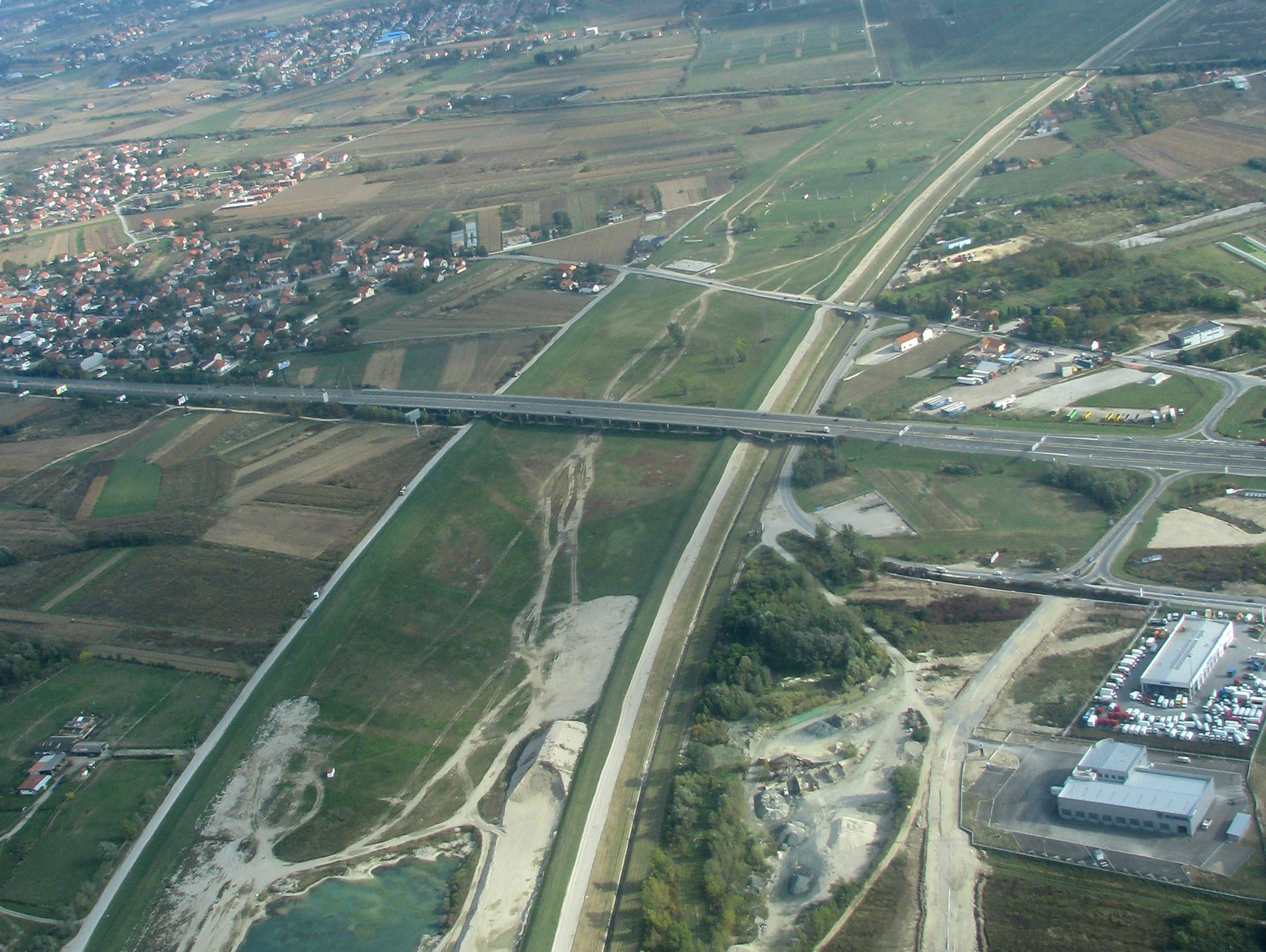
Bridge over the Sava-Odra floodwater canal

After the interchange, the roadway widens to eight lanes. A gas station opened in February 2008 and owned by OMV Croatia is open 24 hours a day and offers a convenience store 600 m (660 yd) westbound from the Lanište Street interchange.

Directly west of the OMV gas station, there is an at-grade intersection that connects to a nearby roundabout in the south, which in turn connects the Jarušćica Street (providing access to Remetinec as well as western parts of Lanište) as well as another street that leads to an intersection of the Remetinec Road (extended in 2008), the Karlovac Road, and the Brezovica Road, connecting the suburbs of Remetinec, Blato, and Botinec, respectively. The aforementioned Jadranska Avenue intersection also has a northern outlet, marked Local Route L10054, that leads north towards the University Hospital (currently inoperative) and the Zagreb Golf & Country Club. This intersection is the only at-grade intersection of Jadranska Avenue.

The avenue continues along a straight line trailing the northern border of Blato for another 2 kilometers (1.2 mi) before bridging the Sava-Odra floodwater canal by the means of a 435 m (1,427 ft) long viaduct. After the bridge, the road enters a collector/distributor road setup, which accompanies it through the last few interchanges. Two RIROs provide entry and exit to the Karlovac Road in Blato, Lučko, Hrvatski Leskovac and the Brezovica city district. Immediately thereafter, the Lučko stack interchange with the Zagreb bypass is located.

Noise barriers are also planned to be installed at the Lučko interchange.

== History ==
Jadranska Avenue was conceived as an expressway approach for the Zagreb–Karlovac highway (today part of A1), the first highway in Croatia. Together with the Karlovac expressway, its construction cost 110 million Yugoslav dinars. It was built in 1972 as an extension of Dubrovnik Avenue (then called Boris Kidrič Avenue after the eponymous Yugoslav political figure) and it spanned from the Dubrovnik Avenue and Adriatic Bridge intersection to the old Lučko Interchange, without any exits. The avenue was 28 meters (92 ft) wide and had three traffic lanes in each direction, similar to the A1 lane setup, which also features a 28-meter pavement with three lanes in each direction, but one of them is marked as a hard shoulder. At the time, the Zagreb bypass was in planning stages and the Lučko Interchange only provided access to Lučko and the old Karlovac Road through two RIROs (still used today) and the large stack interchange was built and opened for traffic as late as 1979. Like most Croatian highways, the expressway was planned with a design speed of 120 kilometers per hour (75 mph) in mind.
