= Zagreb Markets =

Tržnice Zagreb
- Founded: 1930; 95 years ago
- Founder: City of Zagreb
- Headquarters: Zagreb, Croatia
- Area served: City of Zagreb
- Products: market management, business space rental
- Owner: City of Zagreb
- Parent: Zagreb Holding
- Website: www.trznice-zg.hr

The Zagreb Markets (Croatian: Tržnice Zagreb) is a subsidiary of Zagreb Holding that operates with 28 marketplaces in Zagreb by renting retail spaces and commercial properties. It was founded in 1930 by the City of Zagreb authorities. It is biggest wholesale market in Croatia, supplying entire Northwestern Croatia.

== Markets' locations ==
There are 28 markets:

- Branimirova Market
- Botinec Market
- British Square Market
- Dolac Market
- Dubec Market
- Dubrava Market
- Gajnice Market
- Jarun Market
- Kažotić Square Market
- Kustošija Market
- Eugen Kvaternik Square Market
- Prečko Market
- Sesvete Fair Market
- Savica Market
- Savski gaj Market
- Sesvete Market
- Špansko Market
- Trešnjevka Market
- Trnsko Market
- Trnje Market
- Utrina Market
- Volovčica Market
- Vrapče Market
- Green Market (Zelena tržnica)
