= Trokut =

Neighbourhood of Zagreb, Croatia

Coordinates: 45°46.3′N 15°57.6′E

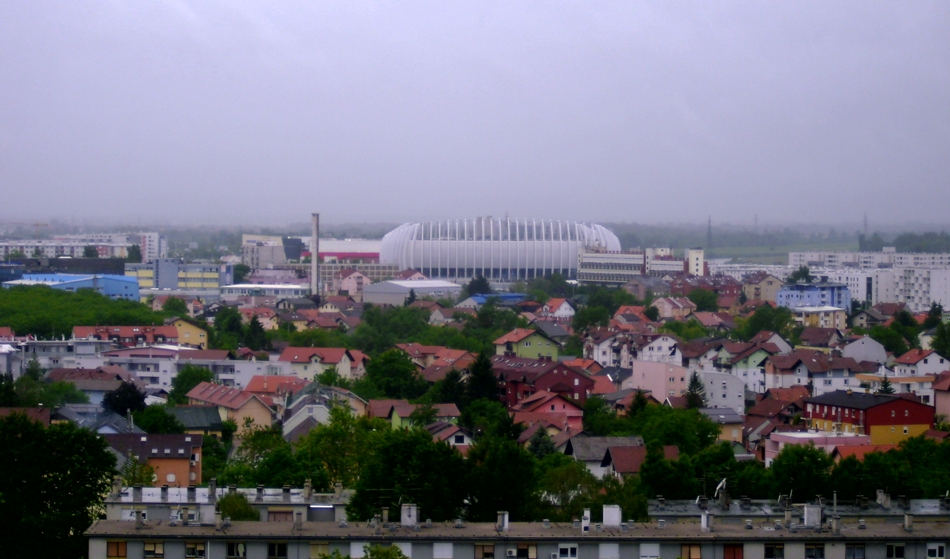
- Aerial view of Trokut with Arena Zagreb in the distance
- Interactive map of Trokut

Trokut (lit. 'Triangle') is a quarter in Novi Zagreb - zapad (New Zagreb - West). It is surrounded by five other quarters: Kajzerica (north), Remetinec (southwest), Sveta Klara (south), Trnsko (southeast, east) and Savski gaj (west). The quarter's name comes from the word triangle, because of the intersection of three railroads, which has an isosceles triangle shape. Trokut is located in the middle of the intersection. It is administratively part of Savski gaj.

The quarter is made of more than 500 houses. Trokut can be accessed from Trnsko, Savski gaj and Sveta Klara. Dubrovnik Avenue passes through the northern part of the triangle, but remains unconnected by road to the rest.
