= Savski gaj =

Neighbourhood of Zagreb, Croatia

Coordinates: 45.7737°N 15.9549°E

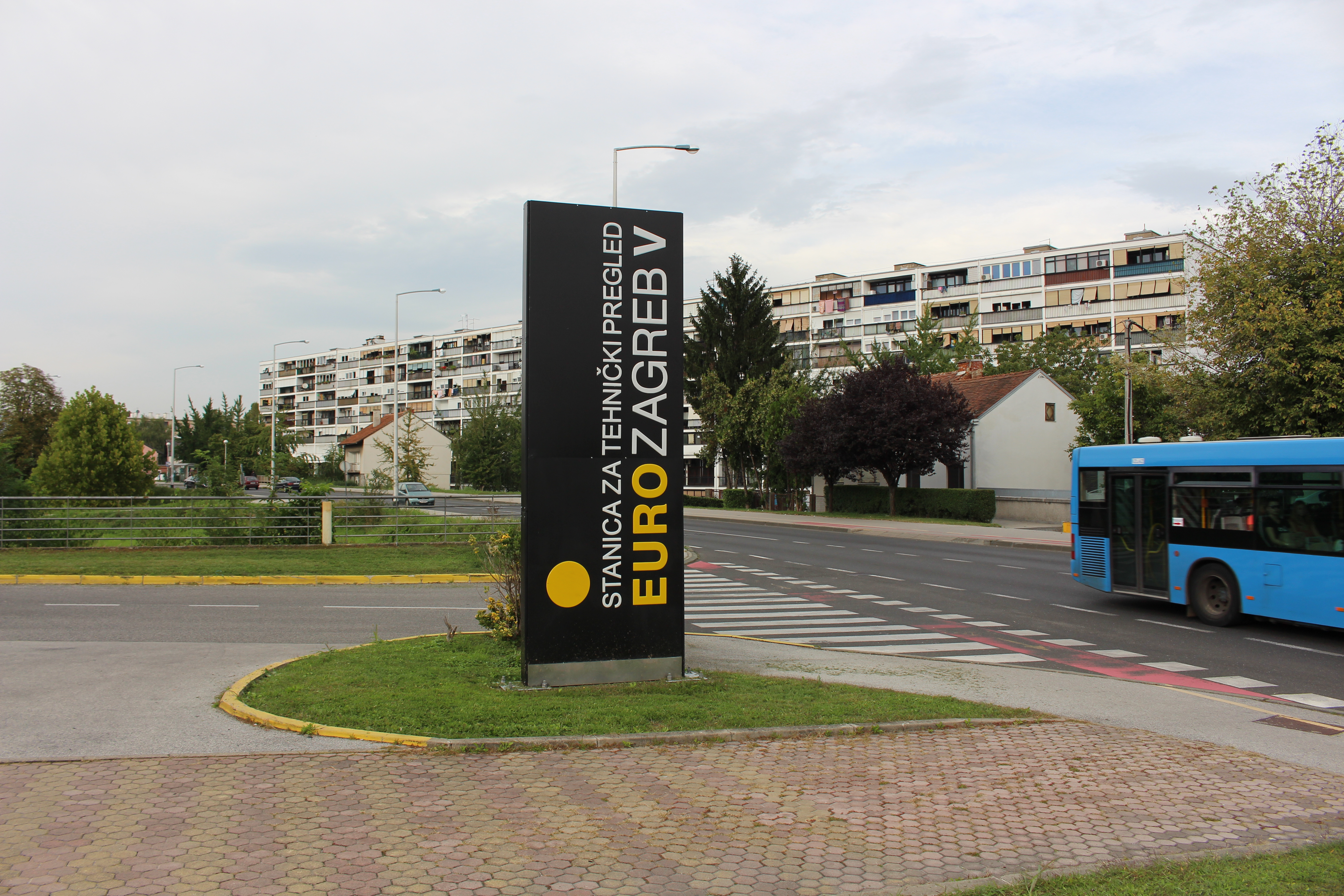
- The residential and business building on the right is in Savski gaj, on the left is Lanište
- Interactive map of Savski gaj

Savski gaj (English: Sava's grove) is a neighborhood in Novi Zagreb - zapad district (New Zagreb - West) of Zagreb. It is surrounded by five other quarters: Kajzerica (north, northwest), Lanište (west), Remetinec (southwest), Sveta Klara (south, southeast) and Trokut (east, northeast). It has a population of 5,113 (2011).

The quarter is made of one apartment block of 16 floors, around eleven smaller blocks and many small houses. Savski gaj has a bus stop, and a tram station. Savski gaj can be accessed from Dubrovnik avenue, Trokut, Sveta Klara, Remetinec and Lanište. Bus stop can be accessed by walking, but to access the nearest tram station one has to go through an underground passage, which leads under the Dubrovnik Avenue.
