= Kajzerica =

Neighbourhood in Zagreb, Croatia

Coordinates: 45°47′0″N 15°57′39″E

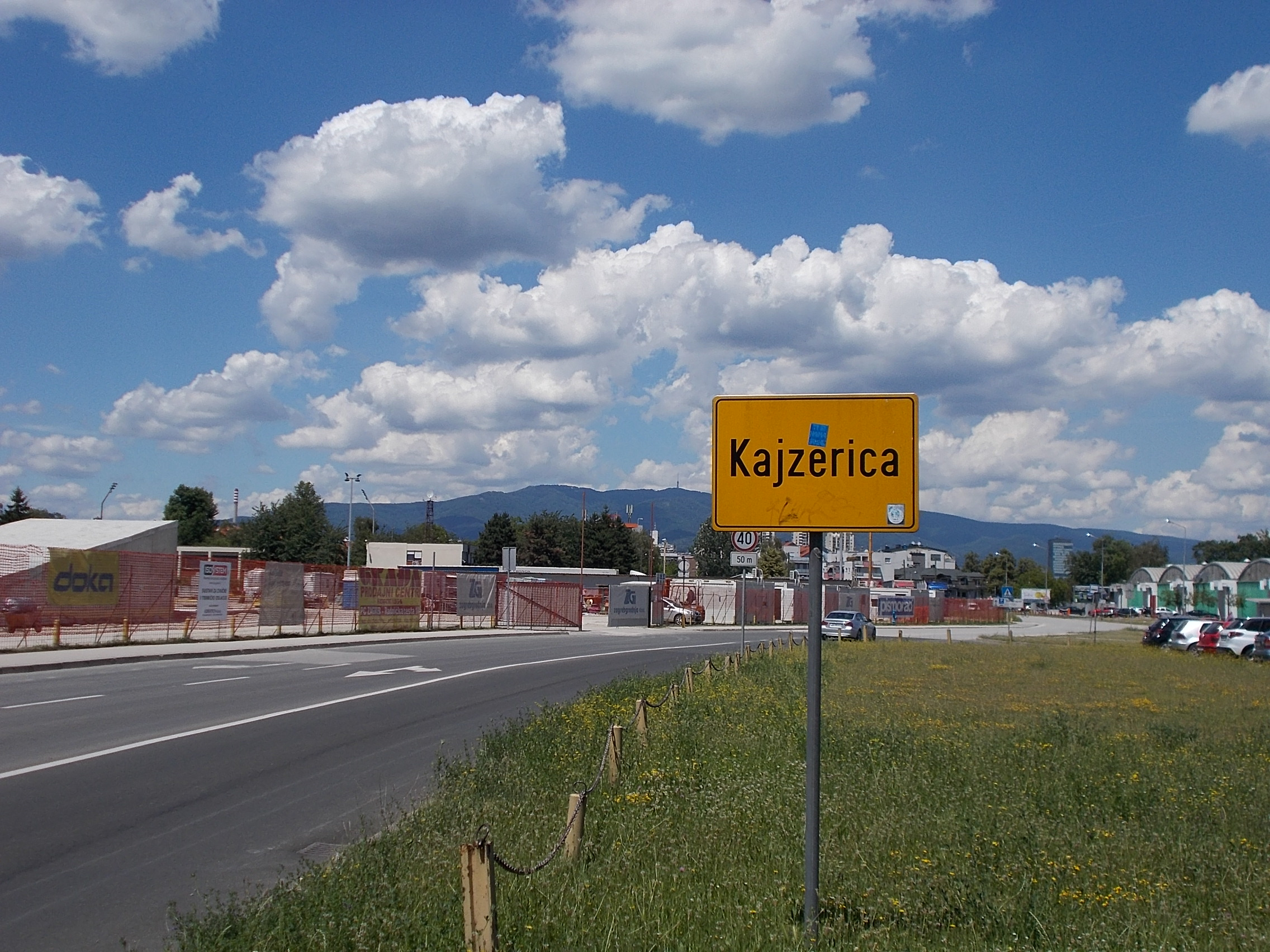
- Interactive map of Kajzerica

Kajzerica is a neighbourhood located in the Novi Zagreb – zapad city district of Zagreb, the capital of Croatia. It is located west of Bundek Lake (Jezero Bundek) and east of the Western Rotary and Adriatic Bridge. It has a population of 4,387 (2011).

== Sights ==
Zagreb Fair and Zagreb Hippodrome are located in Kajzerica.

== Transport ==
Kajzerica houses the south end of the old pedestrian-only Sava Bridge. Roads provide access to the Dubrovnik Avenue and the Adriatic Bridge and the neighborhood is served by Zagrebački električni tramvaj tram lines 7 and 14 that travel through Novi Zagreb.

== Sport and leisure ==
The Igralište na Kajzerici (on Ul. Radoslava Cimermana) is the traditional home ground of NK Lokomotiva Zagreb but due to the size of the facility it is only used for club's base and youth teams. It was once a significant motorcycle speedway stadium run by the Avto Moto Društvo Remetinec. It hosted competitions throughout the 1960s, including a qualifying round of the Speedway World Championship in 1960 and 1970 and a round of the 1967 Speedway World Team Cup.

== History ==
In 2004, there was a boom of Chinese immigration at Kajzerica, leading some to call it a 'Chinatown'. By 2014, the Chinese shops in the city were no longer concentrated in Kajzerica.

== Church of the Nativity ==
In the neighbourhood exists Church of the Nativity, which is a Catholic parish church. The church is located in a renovated family house built in 1954, and was converted into a church in 1970.

After the parish was founded in 1969, the family home was purchased on September 7, 1970, with the intention of converting it into a church. The building was officially opened for worship on Christmas Day 1970.

Over the years, the church has been renovated and expanded several times, and on August 3, 1993, it was blessed by the auxiliary bishop of Zagreb, Marko Culej.

In the attic of the church building, above the liturgical space, Radio Marija, the first Catholic radio station in Croatia, began operating on February 22, 1997. The station operated in that space until August 2002.

This parish was initially administered by the Salesians, after which the Franciscans took over pastoral care. Since 2012, the parish has been entrusted to diocesan priests.

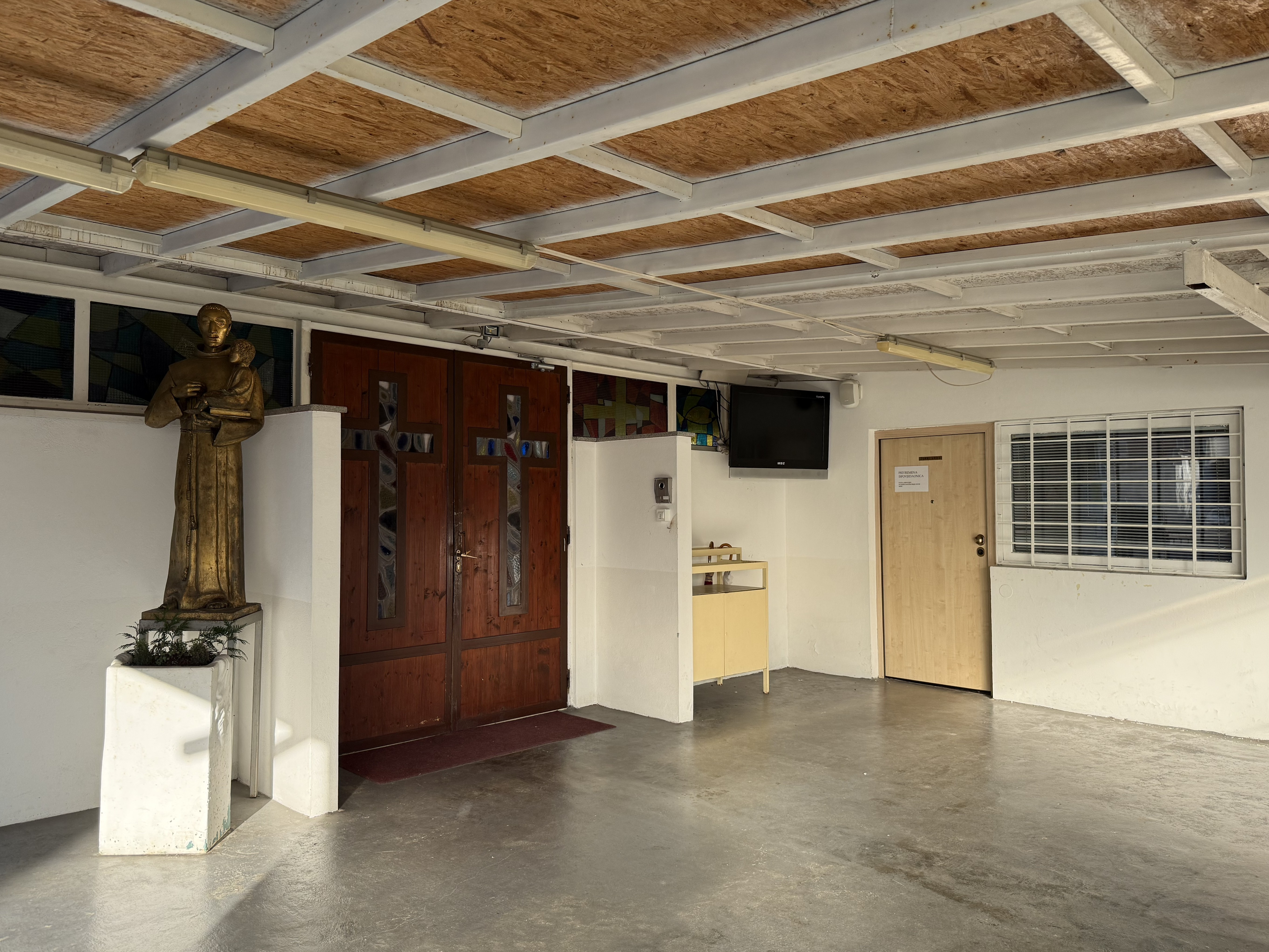
Entrance door and sculpture at the entrance

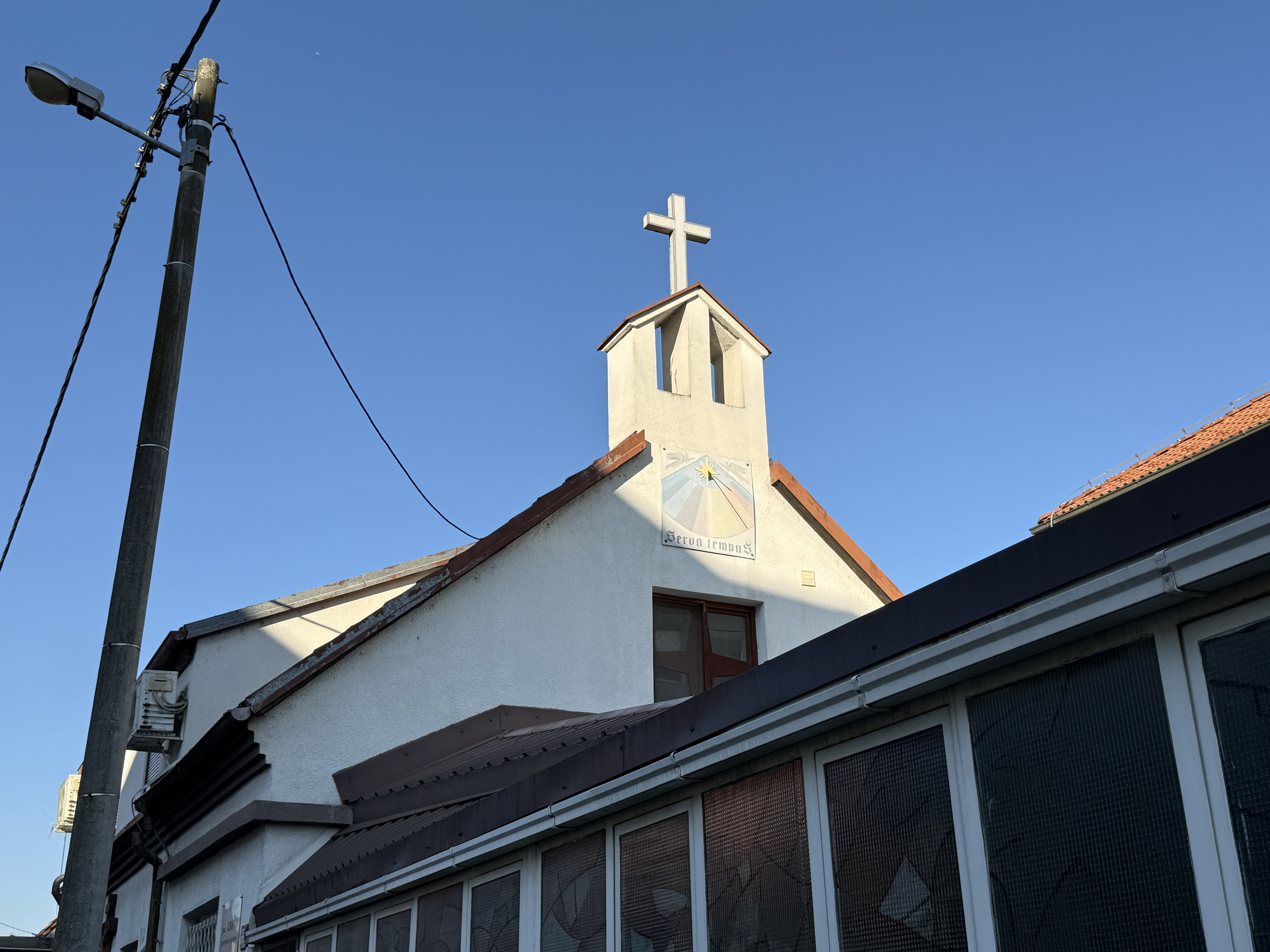
View of the church

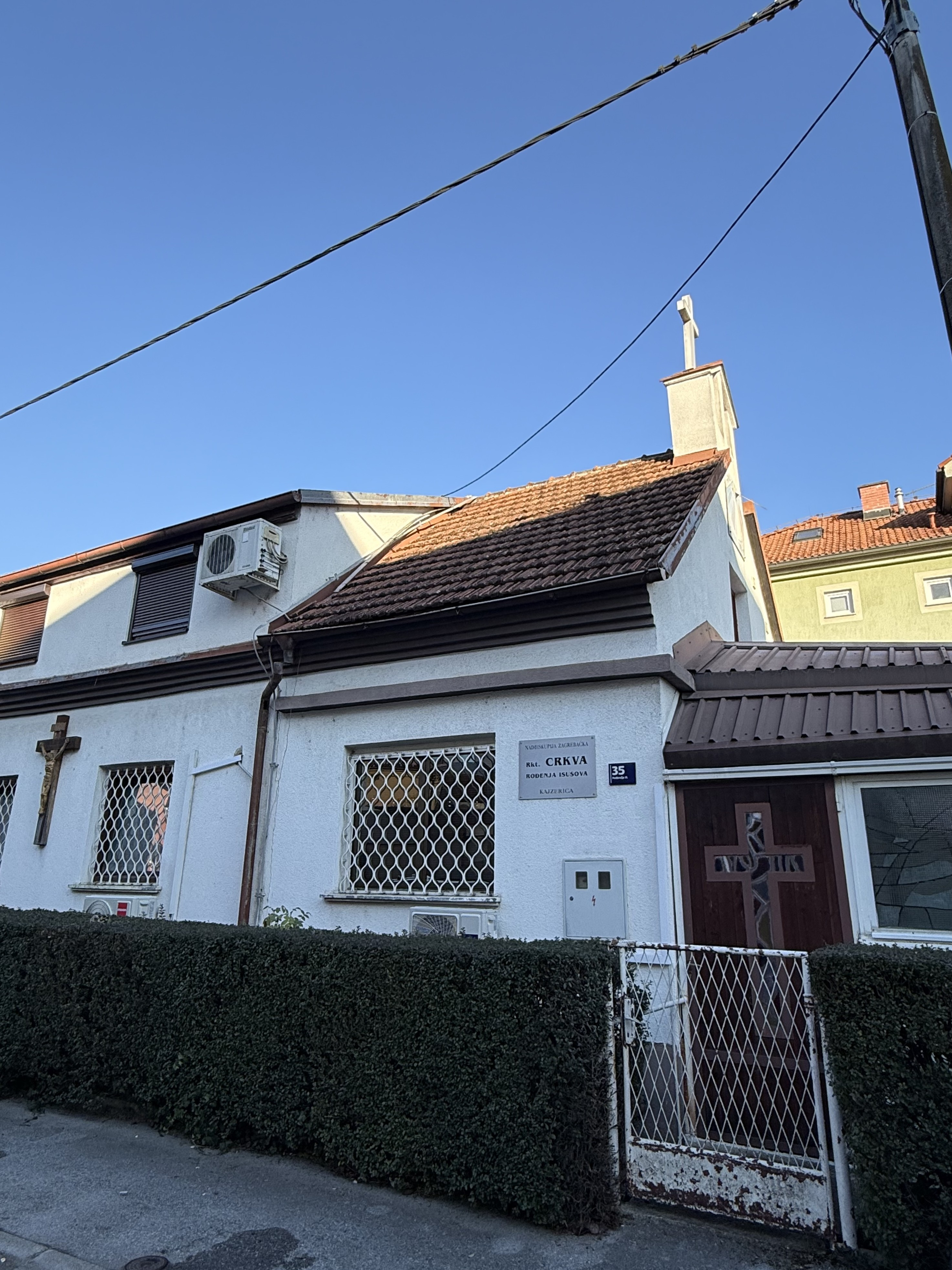
View of the church
