= Church of the Holy Angels, Zagreb =

Church of the Holy Angels (Croatian: Župna crkva svetih anđela)
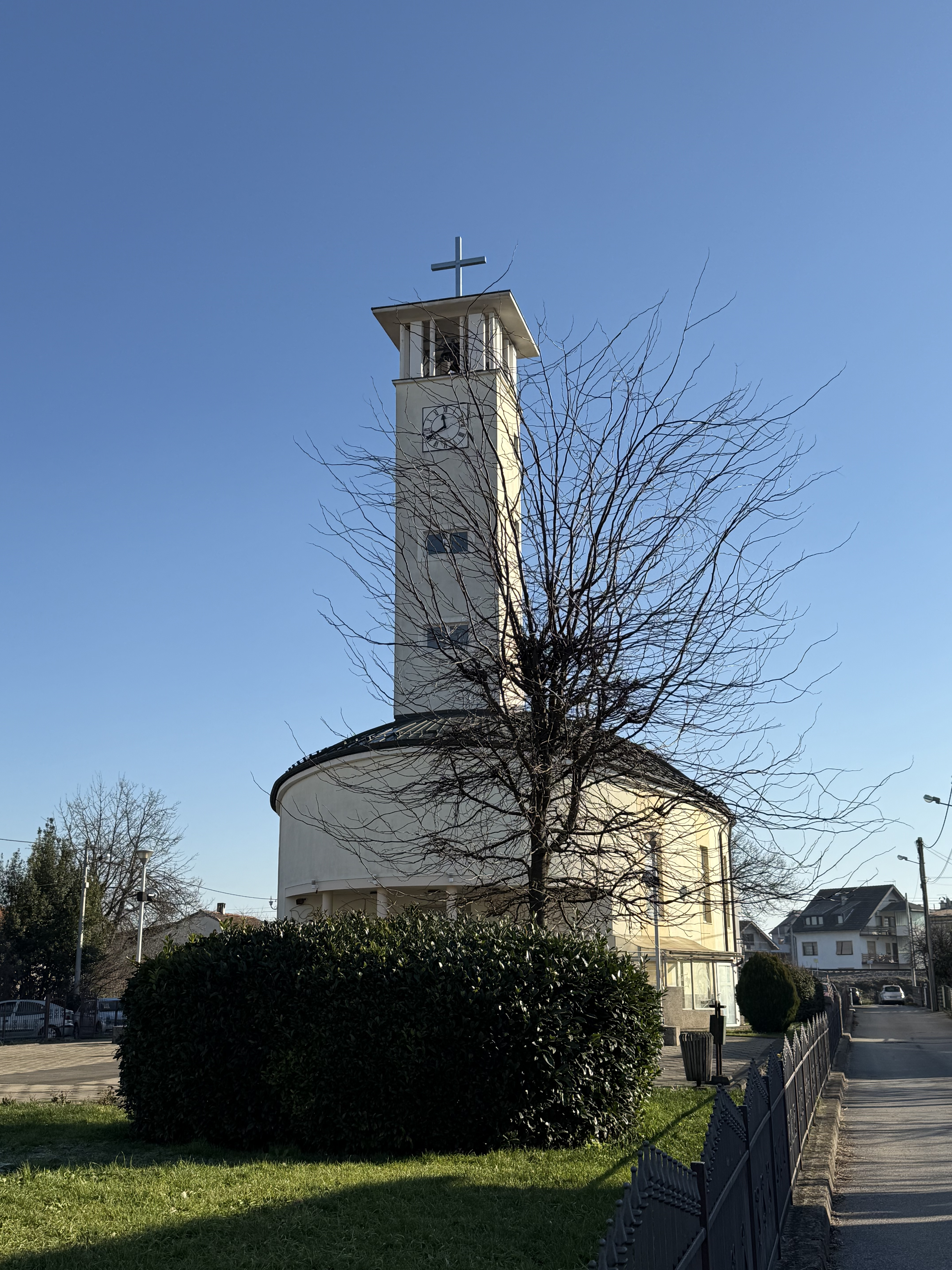
- View of the church and the fenced square in front of the church
- Church of the Holy Angels (Croatian: Župna crkva svetih anđela)
- 45°46′22″N 15°57′18″E
- Location: Zagreb
- Country: Croatia
- Denomination: Roman Catholic

Architecture
- Functional status: Active
- Completed: 1996

Church of the Holy Angels, Zagreb (Croatian: Župna crkva svetih anđela u Zagrebu) is a Catholic parish church located in the neighbourhood Savski gaj of Zagreb, Croatia.

== History ==
The church was consecrated on April 15, 2007, by the Archbishop of Zagreb, Cardinal Josip Bozanić. The current parish church was built from 1994 to 1996.

== Architecture ==
The architectural design for the church was created by Stjepan Krajač.

The church is located in a settlement of medium density and low-rise buildings, mostly family houses. The building is set back into the plot, creating a spacious square in front of it. The space has a private character, emphasized by a physical fence that separates it from the public space of the city. The entrance to the church is raised above the level of the square, and is further emphasised by an entrance porch.

== Gallery ==
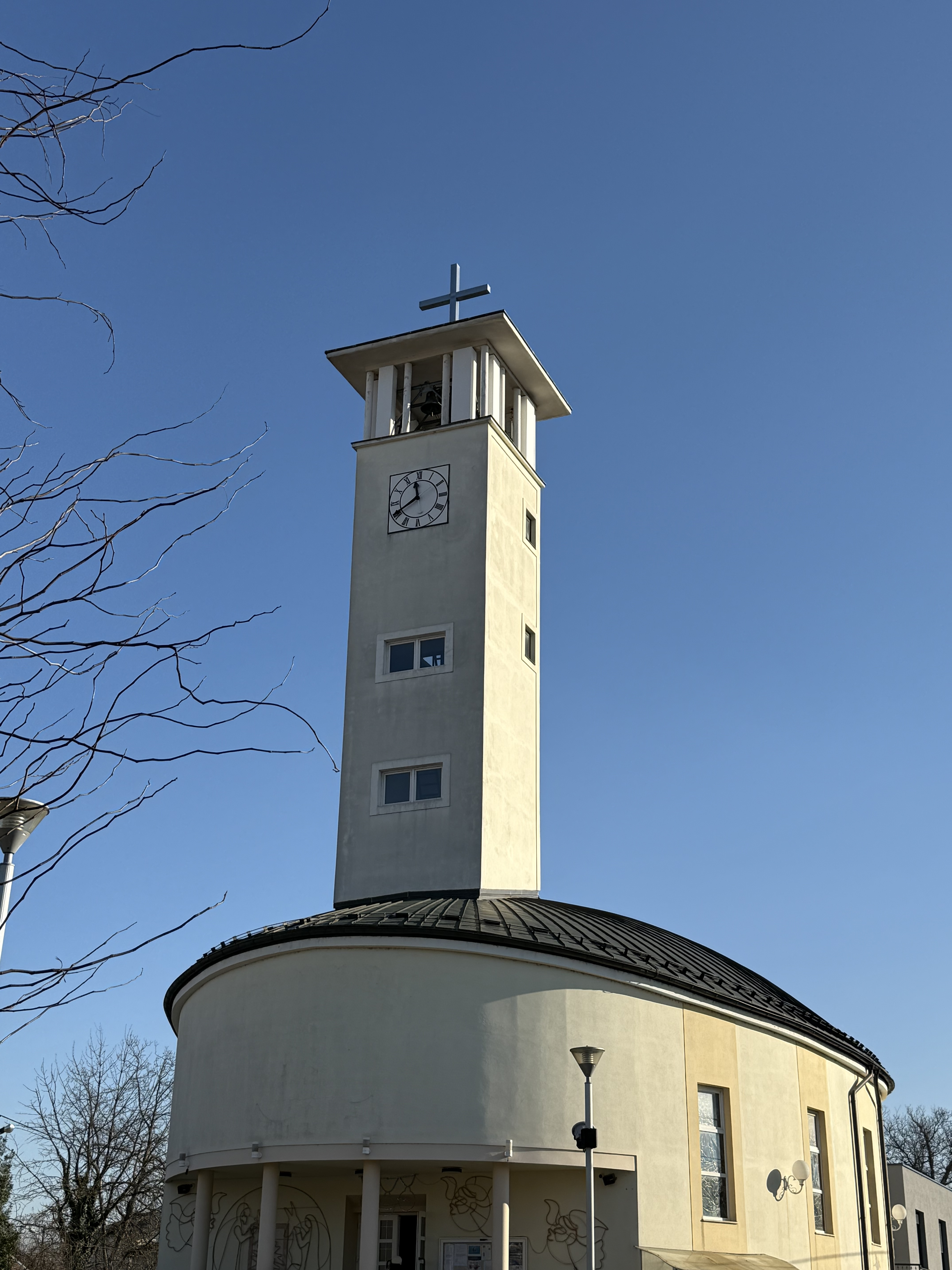
Bell tower and church facade
