= Mediterranean Book Festival =

Annual book fair held in Croatia

- Status: Active
- Venue: Gripe Sports Center
- Location: Split
- Country: Croatia
- Inaugurated: 2017
- Organizer: Association of Publishers and Booksellers of the Croatian Chamber of Economy
- Website: www.mfk.hr

The Mediterranean Book Festival (Croatian: Mediteranski festival knjige), stylized as mfk, is an annual book fair held in Split, Croatia. The inaugural edition of the festival was held between 3–7 May 2017 in the Gripe Sports Center. The festival is organized by the Association of Publishers and Booksellers of the Croatian Chamber of Economy (Croatian: Zajednica nakladnika i knjižara Hrvatske gospodarske komore).

== See also ==
- Interliber
