= Marin Držić Avenue =

Croatian road

Coordinates: 45°48′10″N 15°59′40″E

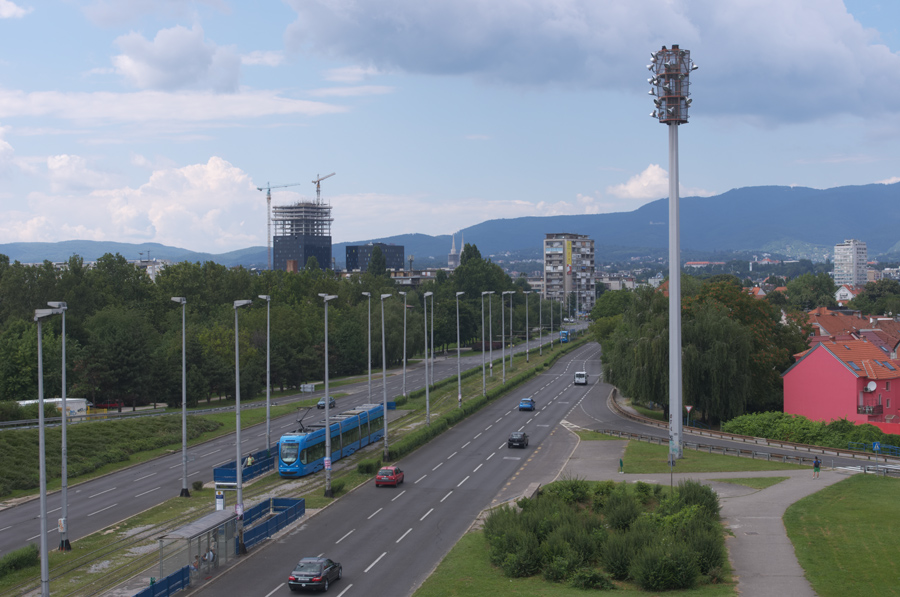
Marin Držić Avenue

Marin Držić Avenue (Croatian: Avenija Marina Držića) is an important north–south avenue in the central-eastern part of Zagreb, Croatia. It is named after Marin Držić, a famous Croatian poet from the 16th century.

It starts at the Petar Krešimir IV Square where it continues south from Šubićeva Street. It intersects with the Branimir Avenue, Vukovar Avenue, Slavonska Avenue (combination interchange), Milka Trnina Street, Sajmišna Road (parclo interchange) and ends at Dubrovnik Avenue (roundabout interchange), continuing south as Sarajevska Road. The avenue carries ZET tram tracks in the median through the entire route. Zagreb's main bus station is also located on the avenue.

It passes through city districts Trnje and Novi Zagreb - istok, at parts serving as a border between Trnje and Peščenica - Žitnjak.

== Notable Buildings ==
- The Zagreb Bus Terminal is located on 4 Marin Držić Avenue.
- The Industrial high school of Engineering is on number 14.
