= Church of the Blessed Virgin Mary Queen of Croats, Zagreb =

Church of the Blessed Virgin Mary Queen of Croats (Croatian: Župna crkva Blažene Djevice Marije Kraljice Hrvata)
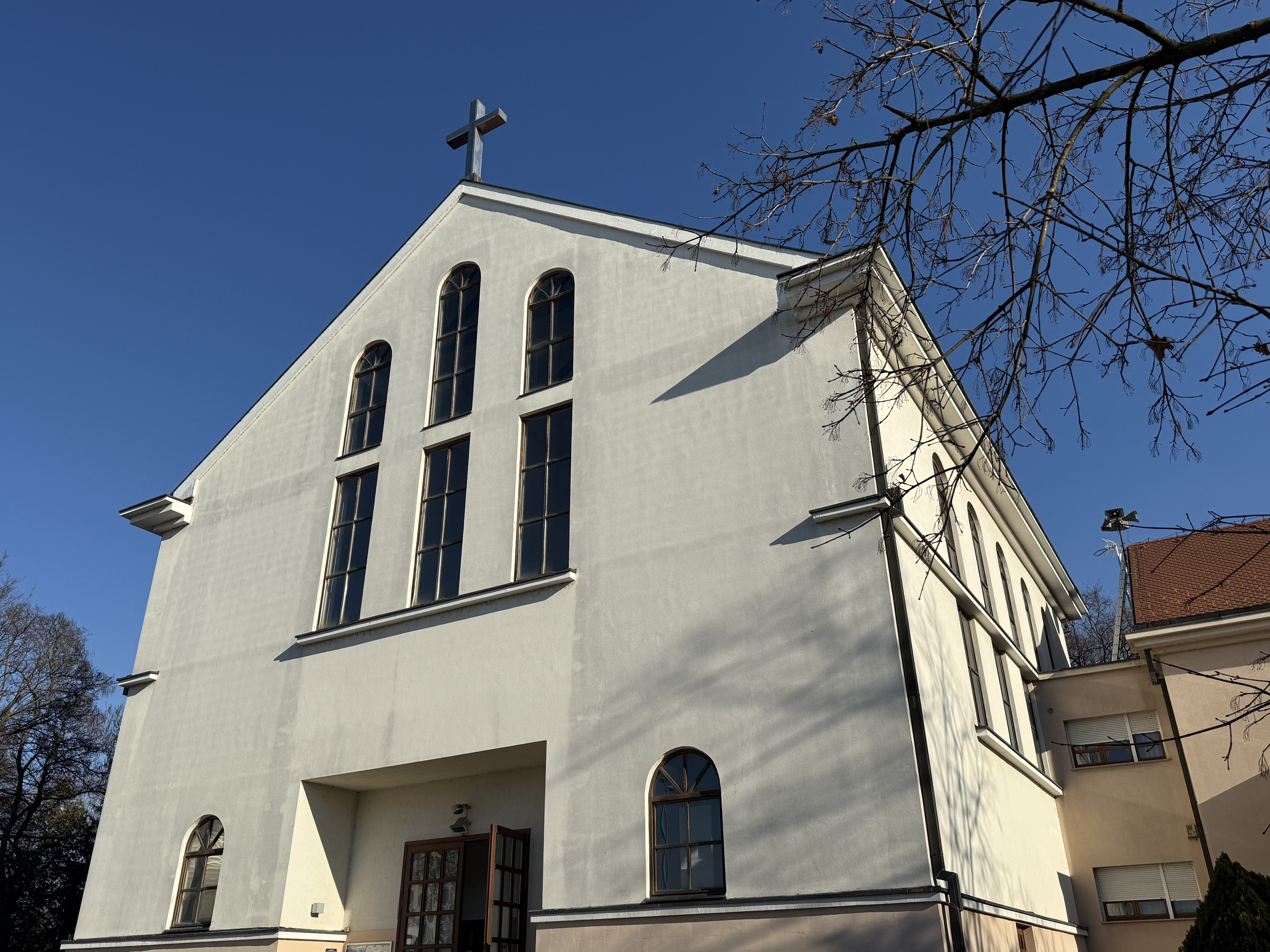
- View of the church
- Church of the Blessed Virgin Mary Queen of Croats (Croatian: Župna crkva Blažene Djevice Marije Kraljice Hrvata)
- 45°46′12″N 15°56′45″E
- Location: Zagreb
- Country: Croatia
- Denomination: Roman Catholic

Architecture
- Functional status: Active
- Completed: 2004

Church of the Blessed Virgin Mary Queen of Croats, Zagreb (Croatian: Župna crkva Blažene Djevice Marije Kraljice Hrvata u Zagrebu) is a Catholic parish church located in the neighbourhood Remetinec of Zagreb, Croatia.

== History and architecture ==
This church is an architectural work by Josip Horvat, designed in 1998. It is located in the neighbourhood Remetinec, which is characterized by predominantly low-rise residential construction. The church does not dominate the urban space with its architecture and is not a visual landmark in the wider urban context. The sacral complex includes the church and the rectory, which are spatially connected. Their arrangement on the plot forms a spacious access square, which has a pronounced public character, while its private function is less pronounced. The square is oriented towards the main road and is conceived as an extension of the public city space.

The dimensions of the church are 20×18 meters. The church area is 360 m^{2}, and the choir is 97 m^{2}. The church building also includes a rectory with a sacristy, a parish office, a religious education hall, and living quarters for the pastor and other staff. The church is square in shape with a square apse at the end. The apse contains a statue of the Mother of God, as well as space for priests and altar boys. To the right of the altar is the tabernacle and a statue of St. Joseph. The altar, baptistery, and ambo are made of stone, straight-lined and unadorned. Below the choir, to the left of the entrance door, is the baptistery. To the right of the entrance door is the confessional and an altar with a statue of St. Anthony.

== Gallery ==
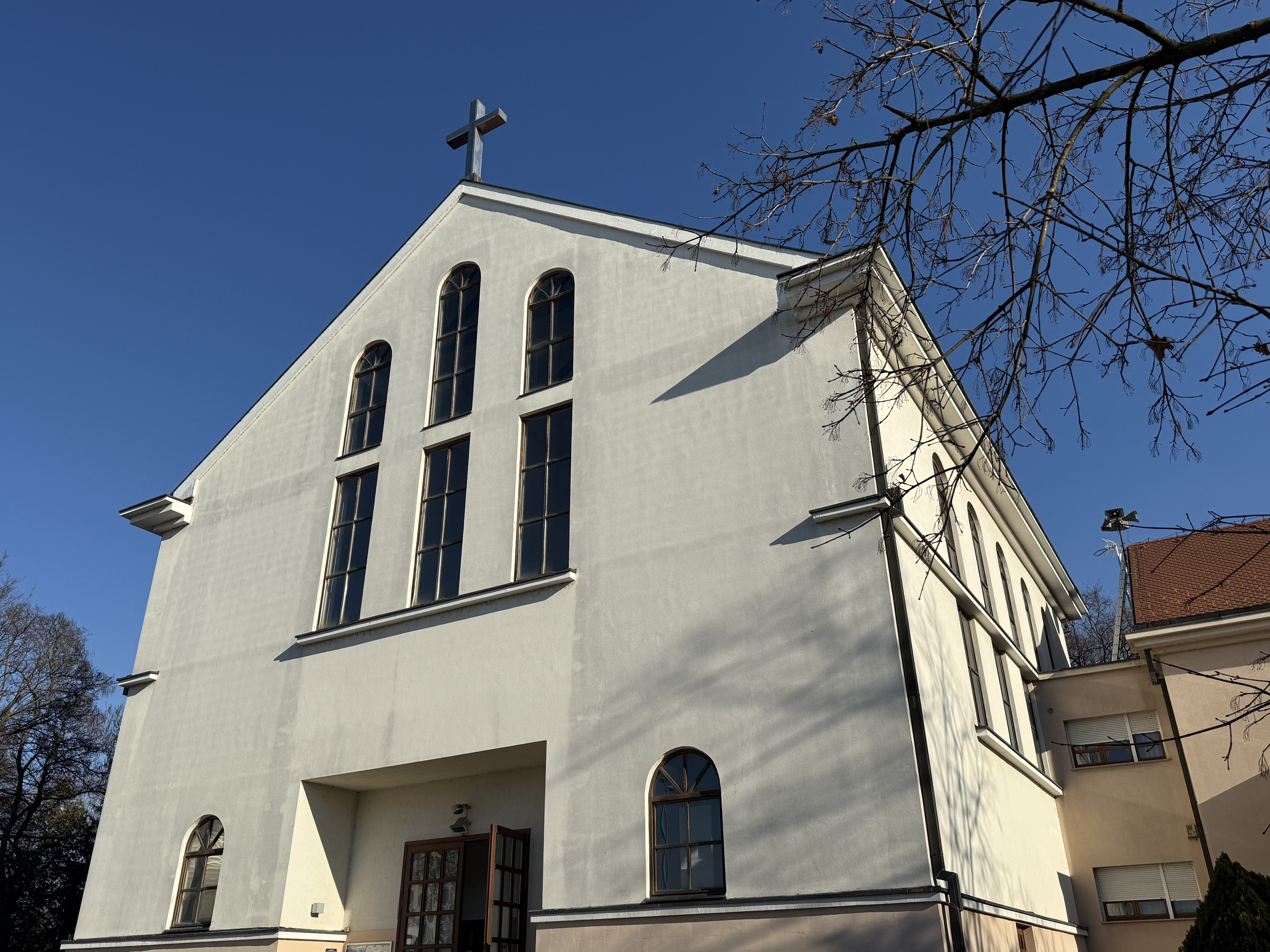
Entrance and facade

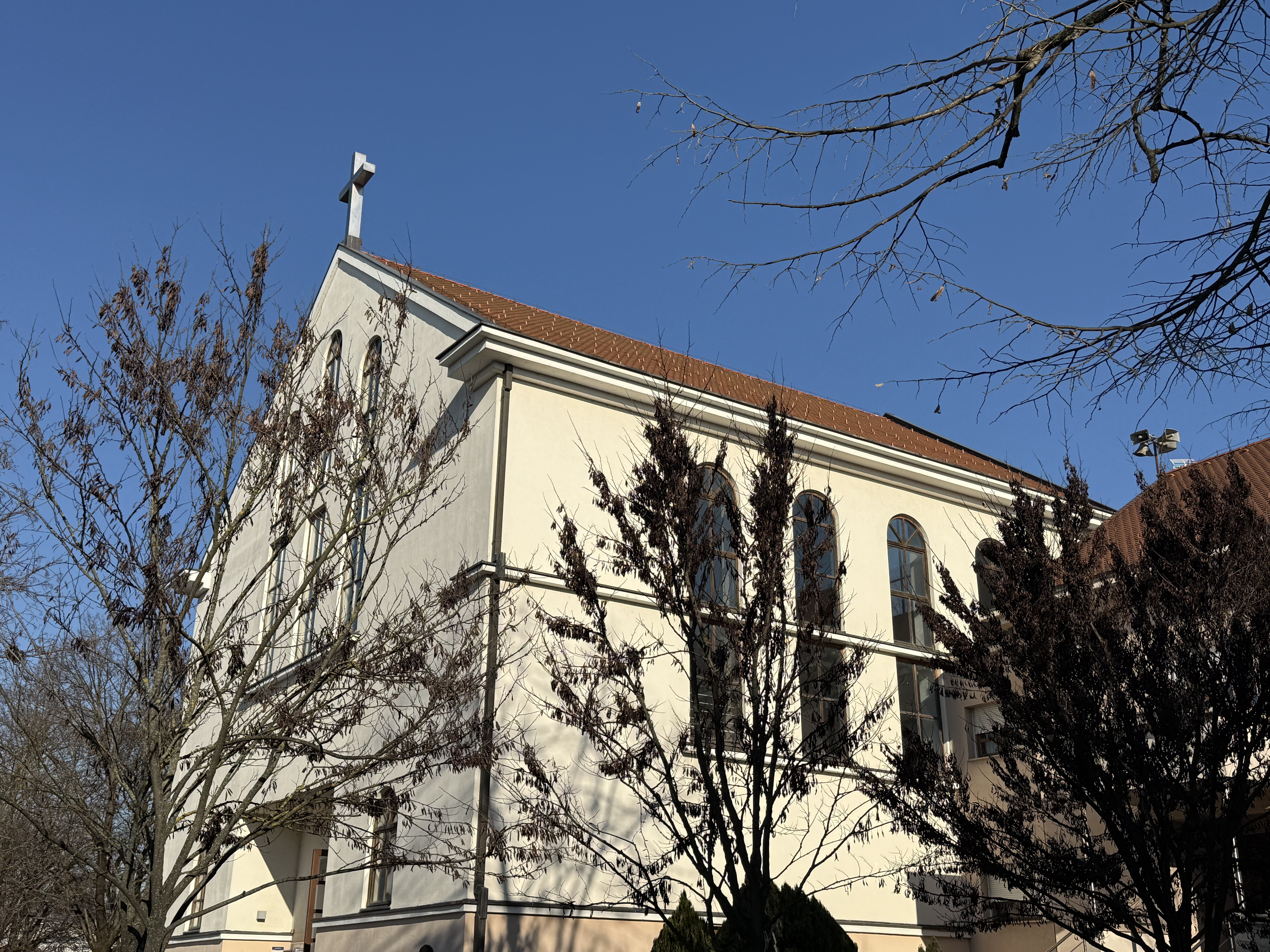
Side facade, view from the street

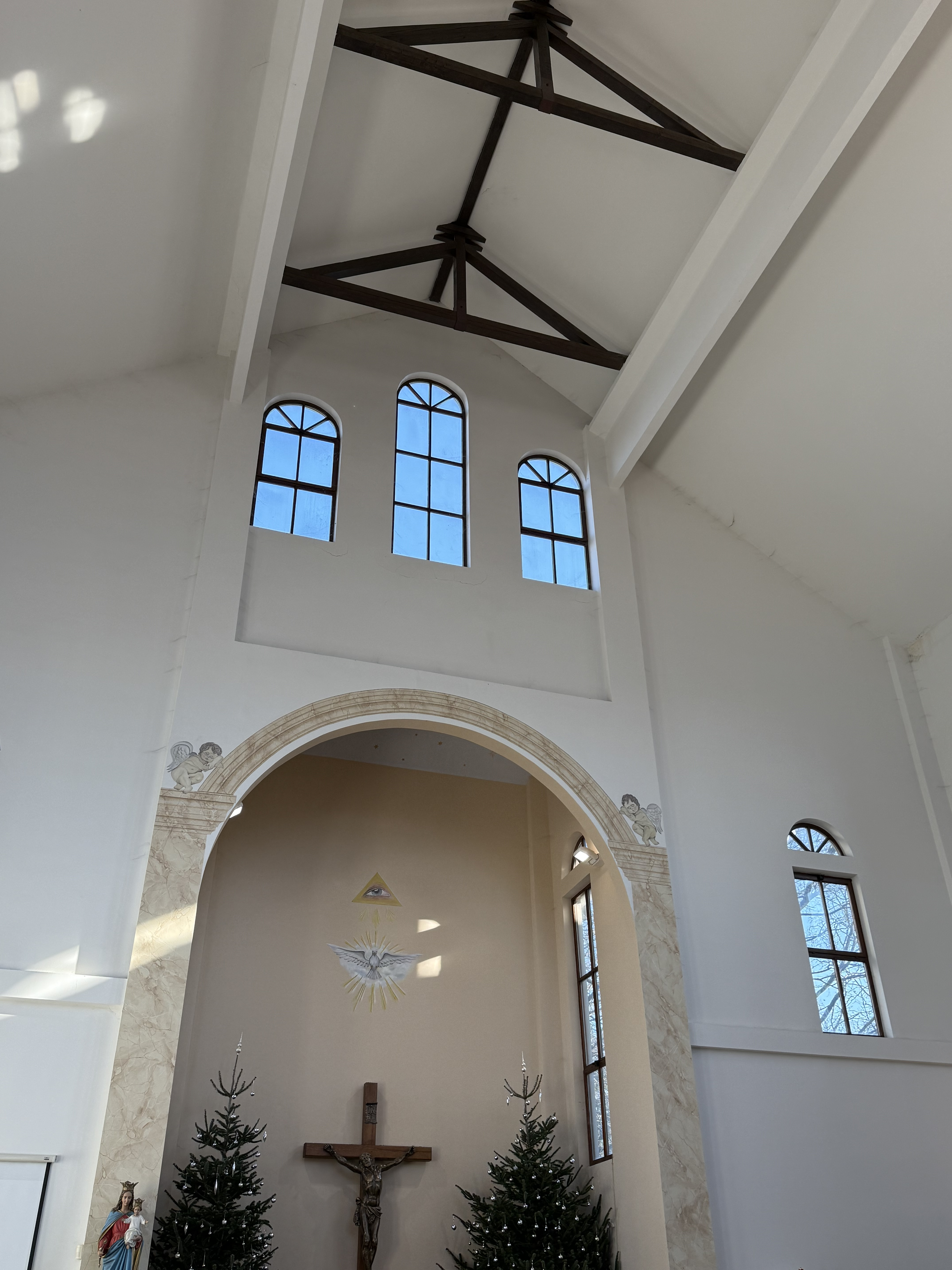
Interior of the church
