= Remetinec, Zagreb =

Neighbourhood in Zagreb, Croatia

Coordinates: 45°46′20″N 15°57′0″E

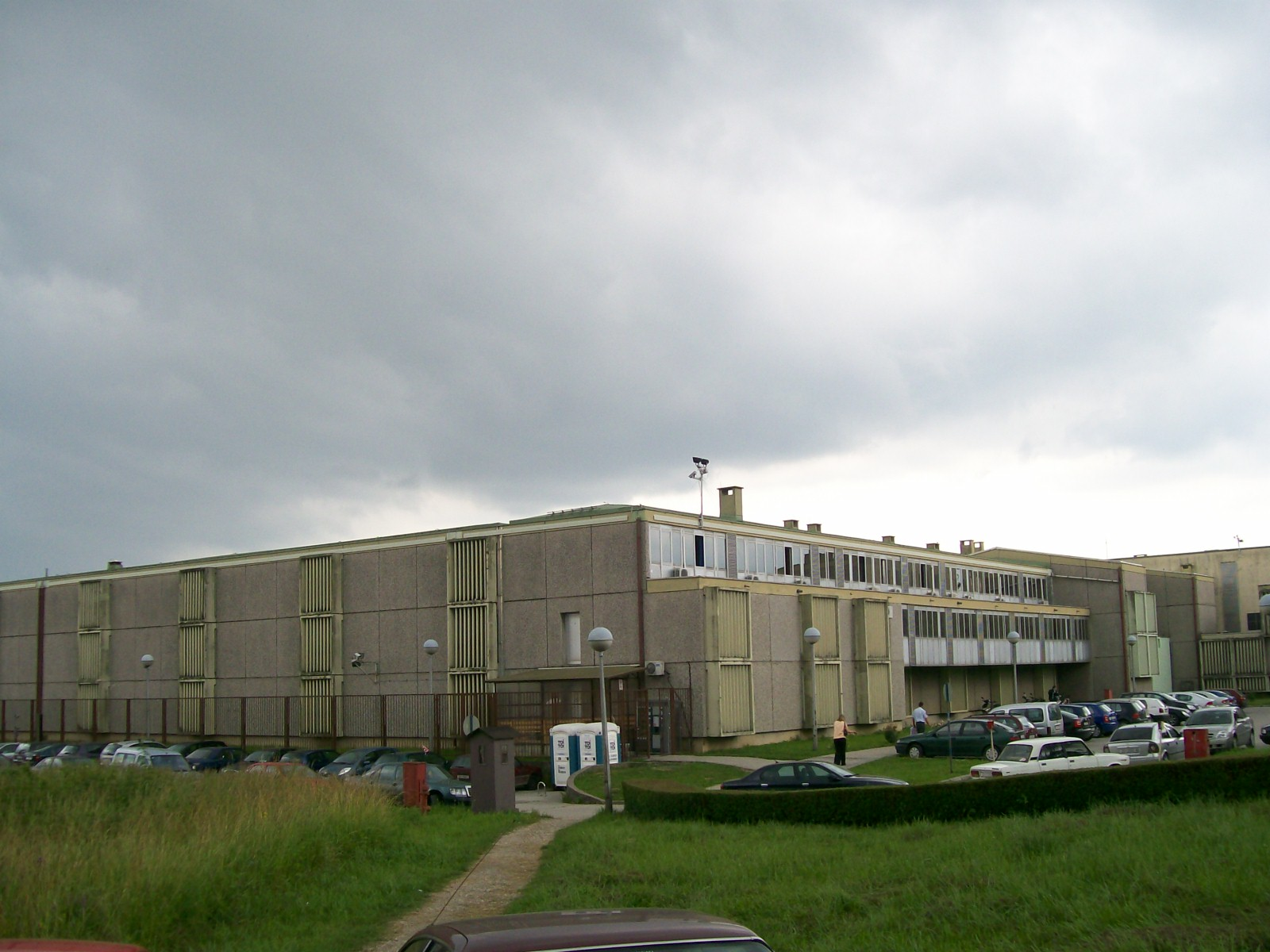
- Remetinec prison
- Interactive map of Remetinec, Zagreb

Remetinec is a neighbourhood in the Novi Zagreb – zapad city district in Zagreb, the capital of Croatia. It is located south of the Remetinec Roundabout and Lanište, west of Trokut and the railway triangle and west of Blato. It has a population of 5673(2021). Zagreb Fair and Zagreb Hippodrome are located nearby Remetinec.

== See also ==
- Remetinec prison
