= Zagreb Bus Station =

Bus station in Zagreb, Croatia

Zagreb Bus Station Autobusni kolodvor Zagreb
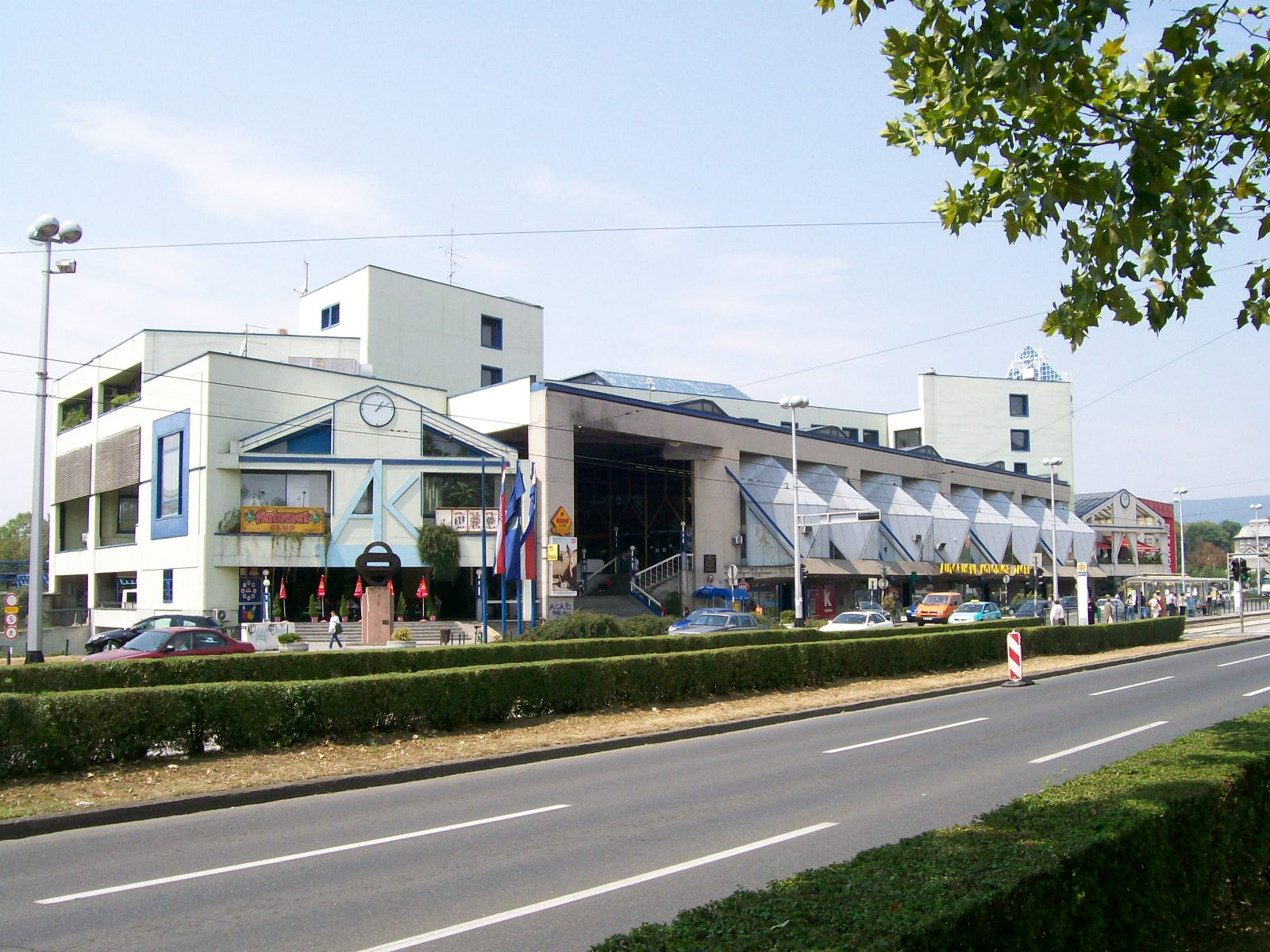

General information
- Location: Marin Držić Avenue 4 Marin Držić Neighborhood, Trnje, Zagreb; Croatia
- Coordinates: 45.8038°N 15.9931°E
- System: subsidiary of Zagreb Holding
- Owner: City of Zagreb
- Operator: Zagreb Holding
- Bus stands: 44

Construction
- Parking: yes
- Cycle facilities: yes
- Architect: Vojteh Ravnikar, Majda Kregar
- Architectural style: brutalism

Other information
- Website: akz.hr

History
- Opening: July 4, 1962
- Rebuilt: 1987
Location

Zagreb Bus Station or Zagreb Coach Station (Croatian: Autobusni kolodvor Zagreb, shorter: AKZ) is the central bus station of Zagreb and the biggest of its kind in Southeastern Europe. Founded in 1961, it was rebuilt for the 1987 Summer Universiade.

The station's operating company is Autobusni kolodvor Zagreb d.o.o., a subsidiary of the Zagreb Holding.

The core businesses are passenger transport, reception of buses, luggage and goods, sale of train tickets, information and cloakroom services. It covers 17,200 m^{2} of indoor space. With 44 terminals, it is the biggest bus station in Croatia. As an "A" category station, it is a member of the Pan-European Association of Bus Stations.

== Location ==
It is located on Marin Držić Avenue 1 km east of the central train station, in the Marin Držić Neighbourhood of the Trnje borough, near Kanal, being one of the most distinctive buildings in the surroundings.

== Routes ==
The Station is an integral part of two TEN-T road network corridors:

- Vb (Mediterranean Corridor): Rijeka–Zagreb–Budapest
- X (Paneuropean Corridor): Salzburg-Ljubljana-Zagreb-Belgrade-Niš-Skopje-Veles-Thessaloniki

Several European road routes pass through Zagreb:

- E59: runs from Jihlava in the Czech Republic, via Vienna, Graz, Maribor and Krapina to Zagreb.
- E65: runs from Malmö in Sweden to the city of Chania in Greece.
- E70: runs from a Coruña in Spain via France, Italy, Slovenia, Croatia, Serbia, Romania, Bulgaria and Turkey to the Georgian city of Poti.
- E71: runs from Košice in Slovakia via Budapest, Varaždin, Zagreb and Zadar to Split.

Zagreb is directly connected by road infrastructure to six highways in Croatia (A1, A2, A3, A4, A6 and A11).

=== Domestic routes ===
Zagreb is connected with all bigger Croatian cities and tourist destinations (Rijeka, Split, Osijek, Varaždin, Pula, Dubrovnik, Rovinj) on a daily basis with multiple buses.

=== International routes ===
Regular international destinations include Vienna, Trieste, Ljubljana, Budapest, Sarajevo, Belgrade etc.

Out of German cities, Berlin, Cologne, Dortmund, Frankfurt, Munich and Stuttgart are connected with daily routes. This is also due to many Croatian gastarbeiter in Germany and large Croatian diaspora.

Out of Italian cities, Bologna, Florence, Milan, Rome and Trieste have regular lines with Zagreb.

In 1990, there were 26 international lines:

International lines (1990)
| Line number | Destinations | Transit line (T) |
|---|---|---|
| 2 | Trieste-Zagreb-Belgrade | T |
| 3 | Paris-Zagreb-Belgrade | T |
| 11 | Splt-Zagreb-Brno | T |
| 13 | Belgrade-Zagreb-Trieste | T |
| 14 | Belgrade-Zagreb-Paris | T |
| 19, 137, 281 | Zagreb-Barcs | |
| 21 | Brno-Zagreb-Split | T |
| 26 | Munich-Zagreb-Virovitica | T |
| 29, 71 | Zagreb-Graz | |
| 34 | Zagreb-Trieste | |
| 58 | Zagreb-Istanbul | |
| 80 | Brno-Zagreb-Crikvenica | T |
| 100 | Prague-Zagreb-Rijeka | T |
| 299 | Zagreb-Nagykanizsa | |
| 403 | Zagreb-Zurich | |
| 404, 493 | Zagreb-Stuttgart | |
| 439 | Virovitica-Zagreb-Stuttgart | T |
| 463 | Rijeka-Zagreb-Prague | T |
| 459 | Makarska-Zagreb-Brno | T |
| 492 | Zagreb-Munich | |
| 552 | Zagreb-Vienna | |
| 578 | Brno-Zagreb-Makarska | T |

== Traffic ==
Daily traffic during winter months is approximated to around 500 buses and 15,000 passengers, while during tourist season (June–September) it surpasses 1,500 buses and over 50,000 passengers.

According to research from 1998, daily sell of tickets during January–March 1997 varied from 1,037 to 4,094.

Passenger statistics
| Year | Buses dispachted | Tickets sold |
|---|---|---|
| 2002 | 171,200 | 1,014,000 |
| 2003 | 170,250 | 1,032,000 |
| 2004 | 169,928 | 1,048,805 |
| 2005 | 164,441 | 1,066,628 |
| 2006 | 160,453 | 1,147,276 |
| 2007 | 161,643 | 1,153,932 |
| 2008 | 160,304 | 1,142,414 |
| 2009 | 155,889 | 1,128,249 |
| 2010 | 155,312 | 1,148,073 |
| 2011 | 157,828 | 1,218,133 |
| 2012 | 158,370 | 1,233,415 |
| 2013 | 162,304 | 1,354,496 |
| 2014 | 166,459 | 1,402,370 |
| 2015 | 168,878 | 1,503,566 |
| 2016 | 176,057 | 1,494,847 |

== Literature ==
- Bilanović, Mirko (2018). Geoprometna analiza autobusnih linija autobusnog kolodvora Zagreb [Geographic Analysis of the Bus Lines at Zagreb Bus Station] (Thesis) (in Croatian and English). Zagreb: Faculty of Transport and Traffic Sciences.
