= Novi Zagreb =

Part of the city of Zagreb, Croatia

Coordinates: 45°46.4′N 15°58.5′E

- Part of Zagreb
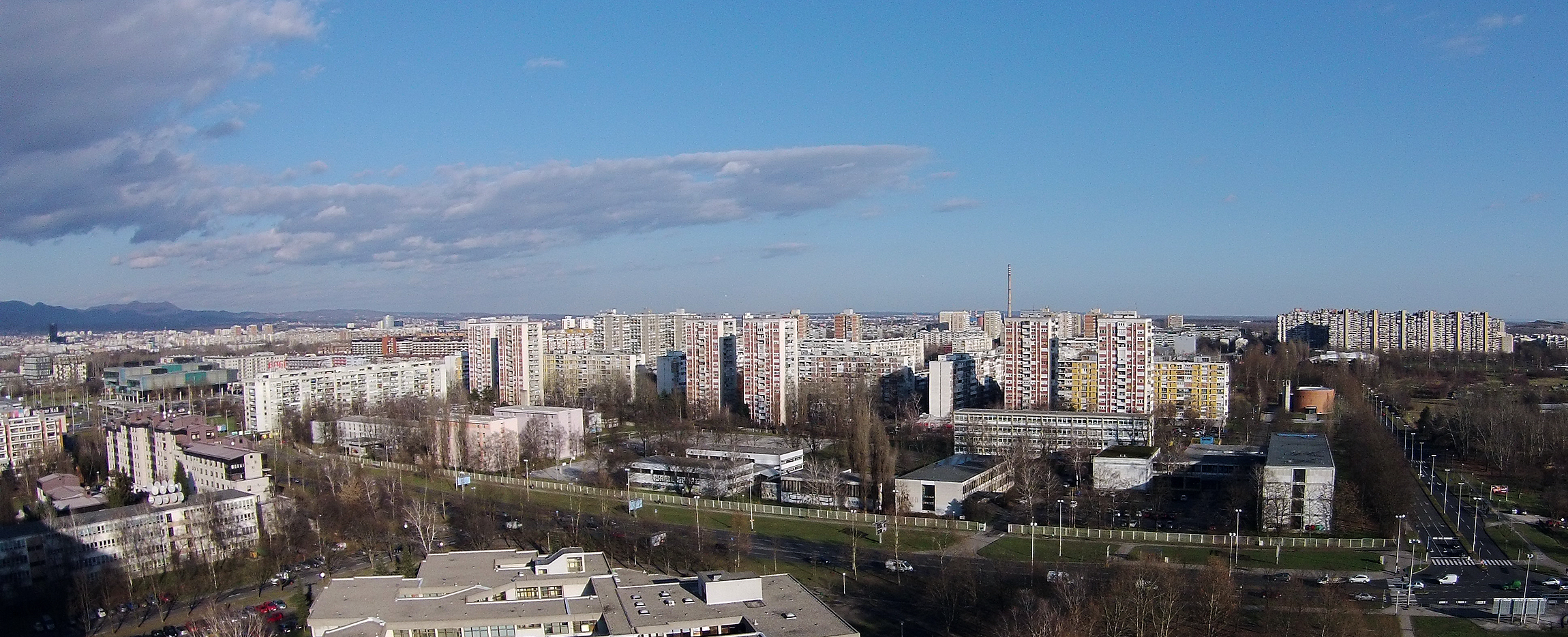
- Urban buildings in Sopot, Zagreb
- Interactive map of Novi Zagreb
- Country: Croatia
- County: City of Zagreb
- Postal codes: 10010 (East), 10020 (West)

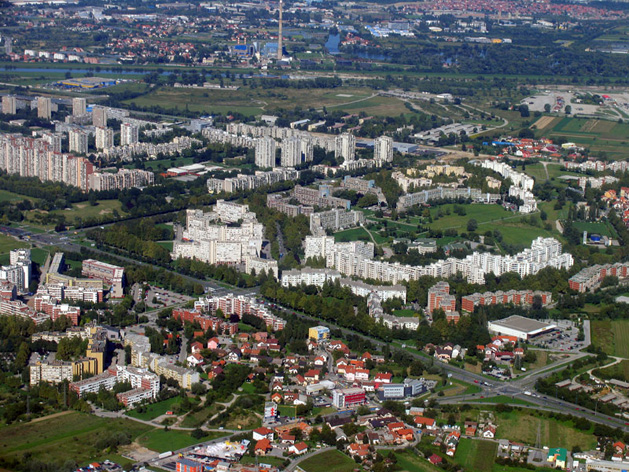
Aerial photograph of Novi Zagreb's eastern part, parts of Dugave, Travno and Sloboština

Novi Zagreb (lit. 'New Zagreb') is the part of the city of Zagreb located south of the Sava river. Novi Zagreb forms a distinct whole because it is separated from the northern part of the city both by the river and by the levees around Sava, esp. those built in 1979, following the 1964 flood. At the same time, the name usually refers to urban parts, while there are also older rural settlements south of the Sava that are administered as part of Novi Zagreb.

It is mostly residential, consisting of blocks of flats and tower blocks that were built during the Socialist era (1945–1990). Although it is not as prestigious as downtown Zagreb, it has been praised for its good road network, public transportation connections and abundance of parks.

Since 2009, Novi Zagreb is divided into three administrative city districts ("četvrti"): Novi Zagreb - istok (East Novi Zagreb), Novi Zagreb - zapad (West Novi Zagreb) and Brezovica.

Expansion of Novi Zagreb was started by the Zagreb mayor Većeslav Holjevac, when he moved the Zagreb Fair from the downtown Savska Road to the southern bank of the Sava river in 1953. In 1957, first plans for developing Novi Zagreb were introduced, depicting what would later be known as Savski Gaj. The first complete solution for habitation with public and commercial contents was made for the neighborhood Trnsko by urbanists Zdenko Kolacio, Mirko Maretić and Josip Uhlik with horticulturist Mira Wenzler-Halambek in 1959–60. It was followed by plans for the neighborhood Zapruđe in 1962–1963, also made by Josip Uhlik.

The Zagreb Hippodrome has been a horse racing field since 1950, as well as a concert venue esp. in more recent times. Across the road from the hippodrome is the Bundek park and lake, north of Zapruđe and Središće. It underwent a complete renovation in 2005. The site later hosted yearly festivals. Other locations in Novi Zagreb have been the site of major city projects. The new building of the Museum of Modern Art was opened in Središće in 2009, after the Avenue Mall shopping center was opened across the interchange in Siget in 2007. In 2008, the Arena Zagreb sports and event hall was built in the Lanište neighborhood. The Arena Centar shopping and entertainment complex was opened in 2010, as well and the numerous adjacent new residential and commercial buildings, parks and plazas. The "Bundek Centar" residential and commercial complex was opened in Središće in 2012.

A new hospital center in Blato was first started in 1982, but then stalled in 1992. Its completion is still planned. The construction of a new bridge spanning the Sava and connecting the Jarun neighborhood with Novi Zagreb has been planned since 2007. The public transportation network expansion with new tram lines is likewise planned in several areas, including over the Jarun bridge in the west and on Sarajevska street in the east.

Zagreb's Remetinec prison is also located in Novi Zagreb since 1987.
