= Zagreb Holding =

City enterprise of Zagreb, Croatia

- Type: holding company
- Founded: 2006
- Founder: City of Zagreb
- Headquarters: Vukovarska St. 41, Zagreb, Croatia
- Area served: Zagreb, Zagreb County, Bjelovar-Bilogora County (GPB), Krapina-Zagorje County (GLJZ)
- Key people: Ivan Novaković (CEO)
- Services: municipal services, market services, utilities sector, pharmacy
- Operating income: 113.50 million €
- Owner: City of Zagreb
- Number of employees: 7,782 (2024)
- Divisions: 3
- Subsidiaries: 12
- Website: https://www.zgh.hr/

Zagreb Holding (Croatian: Zagrebački holding) is a city enterprise of Zagreb, Croatia.

It was established in 2006, according to the Companies Act and it is 100-percent owned by the City of Zagreb.

Zagreb Holding was created by transferring business equities in 21 companies, previously owned by City of Zagreb, to the City Communal Company (Croatian: Gradsko komunalno gospodarstvo), which assumed the role of the holding company. In 2007 the company changed its name to Zagreb Holding Ltd. In the years that followed, it went through several other status changes and transformed into a company consisting of connected companies and institutions that are Zagreb holding. The group consists of Zagreb Holding company with 12 branches, 6 connected companies and 1 institution that manages all the Zagreb's above and below-ground infrastructure.

Zagreb Holding's main task is to efficiently and permanently carry out public services in the city with maximum consideration of public interest and the local community.

== Activities ==
Taking into account number and type of services offered, Zagreb Holding is a unique company in Croatia.

Primarily, it offers public services in the City of Zagreb.

It covers the following business areas:

- municipal services
- water supply and drainage services
- pharmacy services
- gas distribution and production of energy from renewables
- market services.

Municipal services, among other things, includes regular maintenance of 114 hectares of green areas, 2589 kilometers of unclassified roads, daily cleaning and maintenance of public areas, maintenance of public drainage channels, maintenance of 28 cemeteries and crematoriums, as well as public areas that are closed to traffic. It also provides services of public stations, public farmer's markets, parking services on public areas and in public garages, distribution of telecommunication channeling and other communal infrastructure services in the City of Zagreb. The group also maintains public passages, underpasses, fountains, and public toilets, as well as services one of the Zagreb's symbols - Grič cannon.

Market services include managing and maintenance of buildings and sports' facilities, construction, organization of travel and vacation for children, catering and tourism services, logistics, storage of goods, parking of cargo vehicles and Zagreb's Free Zone services, outdoor advertising and wholesale market services. Market services also include waste management, waste collection from citizens, as well as maintenance, protection, managing, reconstruction and development of regional and local roads, and other public transport areas.

Water supply and drainage services include collection, purification and distribution of water, drainage services and construction and maintenance of water supply and drainage networks.

Within the Group there are companies for energy services: they offer gas distribution services and production of energy from renewable sources.

Special activity is a production and distribution of pharmaceuticals, children's food, cosmetics and other health care, with integrated galenic and analytic labs.

Holding issued a local currency municipal bond that was largely purchased by local pension funds.

== History ==
Zagreb Holding was established in 2006, but the history of its services goes back to the second half of the 19th century, when the first utilities' companies were established in Zagreb. Condition of communal infrastructure is the most important indicator of development in any city, and Zagreb's state of communal affairs shows that the city is part of European capitals for more than 100 years.

First Zagreb's utilities' company that was established was Plinara ('Gas Plant') - in 1862. Other of Zagreb's utilities' companies were established in the first half of the 20th century. Rapid growth of the city and the city infrastructure, as well as a rapid rise in population, both due to industrialization and deruralization of the surroundings, forced city administration to establish other utilities' and communal companies.

Zagreb Holding, established in 2006, was in charge of expanding and improvement of communal and utilities services. At the time, it was known as Gradsko komunalno gospodarstvo d.o.o. In 2007 the company changes its name into Zagreb Holding ltd., being the first of its kind in Croatia.

== Structure ==
Holding consists of 12 subsidiaries, 6 (5+1) companies and 1 institution.

(listed alphabetically)

=== Branches (subsidiaries) ===
1. AGM
2. Arena Zagreb
3. Zagreb Bus Station (Autobusni kolodvor Zagreb) (AKZ)
4. Čistoća Zagreb
5. Gradska groblja Zagreb
6. Robni terminali Zagreb (RTZ)
7. Zagreb Markets (Tržnice Zagreb)
8. Vladimir Nazor Ltd.
9. Zagrebparking
10. Zagrebačke ceste
11. Zagrebački digitalni grad (ZDG)
12. Zrinjevac Ltd.

=== Companies ===
1. Gradska plinara Zagreb (GPZ)
  1. Gradska plinara Bjelovar (GPB)
2. Gradska plinara Zagreb - Opskrba (GPZ-O)
3. Gradsko stambeno komunalno gospodarstvo (GSKG)
4. Zagrebplakat

=== Institutions ===
1. Gradska ljekarna Zagreb (GLJZ)

=== Former entities ===
In the April of 2014, Zagreb City Assembly confirmed the separation of Zagreb Fair and ZET from the Holding by voting.
