= Trnsko =

Coordinates: 45°46.4′N 15°57.9′E

- Urban settlement of Zagreb
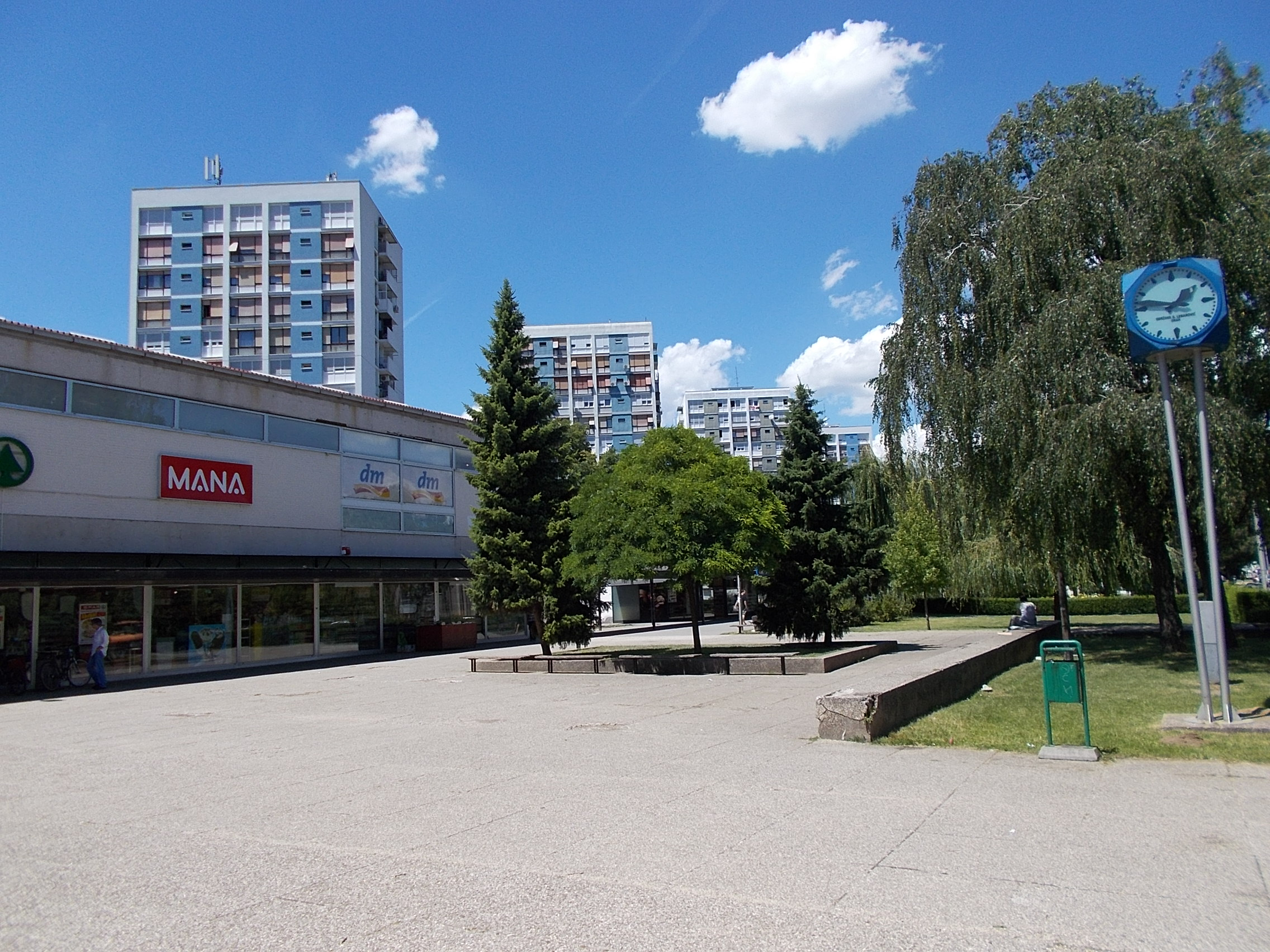
- Trnsko centre
- Interactive map of Trnsko
- Country: Croatia
- City: Zagreb
- City district: Novi Zagreb – zapad

Population (2011)
  - Total: 5,331

Trnsko is a neighbourhood of Zagreb, Croatia, located south of Dubrovnik Avenue in Novi Zagreb - zapad. The population is 5,331 (2011).

Trnsko was one of Novi Zagreb's first neighbourhoods constructed in early 1960s. The streets have no names, but the orientation is easy - Trnsko 1 is on the north and Trnsko 49 on the far south of the neighbourhood.
