= Remetinec prison =

Prison in Croatia

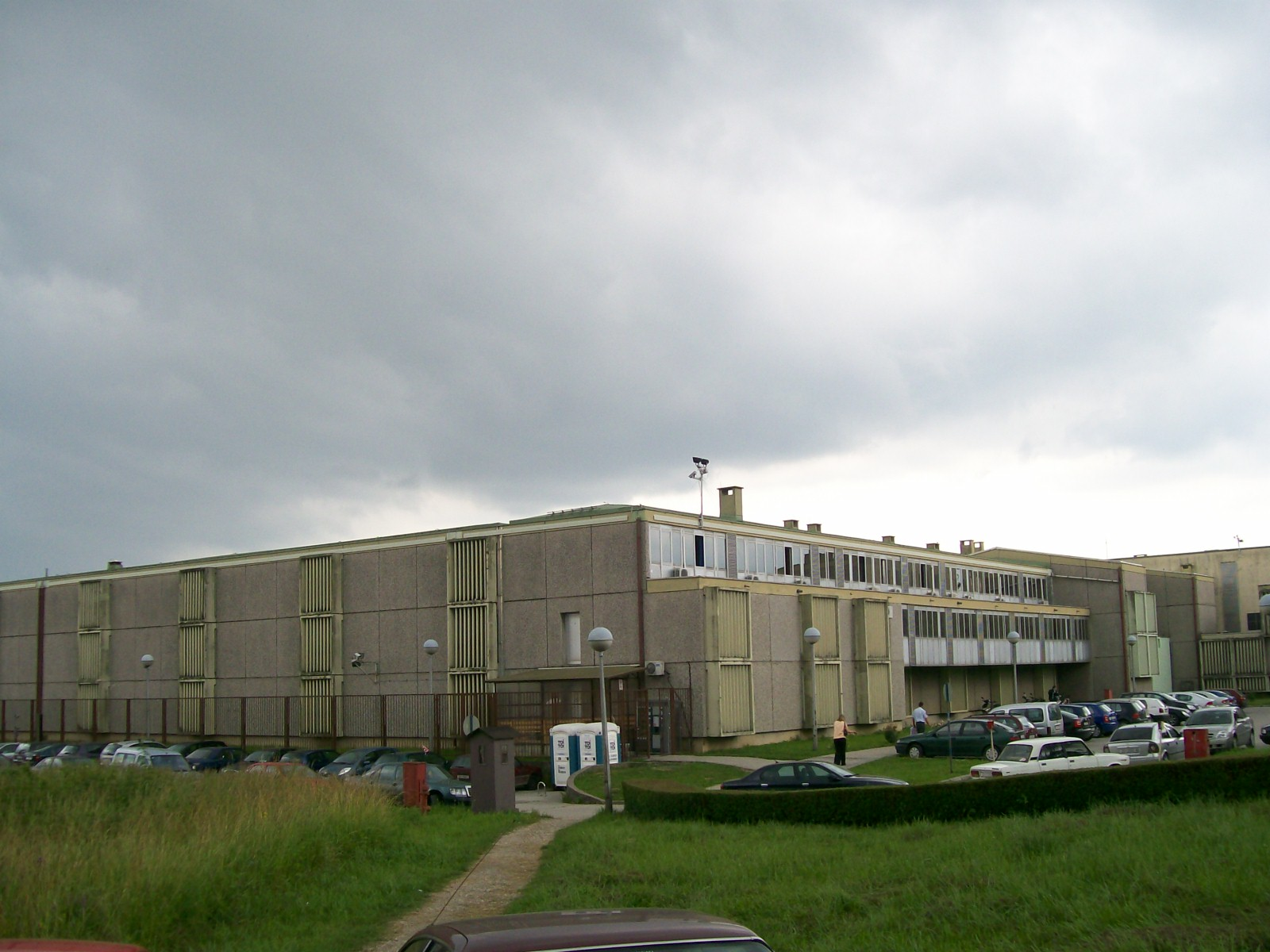
Remetinec prison

The Remetinec Correctional Facility (officially Prison in Zagreb, Croatian: Zatvor u Zagrebu) is a closed-type prison located in Remetinec, a southwestern neighbourhood of Zagreb, Croatia. Colloquially, it's also referred to as Remka, as is the neighbourhood it's located in.

The prison's capacity is 560 inmates, making it the largest prison in Croatia. In July 2012, it housed 904 prisoners and detainees, up from 850 in March 2009. The prison's overcrowding problem is also a major problem of the Croatian prison system in general. Poor living conditions led to a prisoners' hunger strike in May 2008. A planned expansion that will add 340 beds is financed by the Council of Europe Development Bank, and was in documentation stage as of June 2010.

== Notable prisoners ==
- Dinko Šakić, commander of the Jasenovac concentration camp, who died in the prison's hospital in 2008.
- Ivo Sanader, former Prime Minister of Croatia, who was sentenced for corruption in 2012.
- Berislav Rončević, former Croatian defense minister
- Nadan Vidošević, former Croatian minister of economy
- Pussy Riot member Aisoltan Niyazova, who was detained in May 2022.
- Ante Pavlović, a self-proclaimed chiropractic and YouTuber, who was detained for holding a slave, child molesting and assaulting a priest for refusing to acknowledge that he is a reincarnation of Jesus Christ.
- Jasmin Agić - Croatian footballer
- Miljenko Mumlek - Croatian footballer
- Rajko Dujmić, Croatian songwriter, composer and music producer.
- Zdravko Mamić, Croatian former football administrator and sports agent.
- Milan Bandić, a former mayor of Zagreb, accused of corruption.
