= Lanište, Croatia =

Neighborhood of Zagreb, Croatia

Coordinates: 45°46.4′N 15°56.8′E

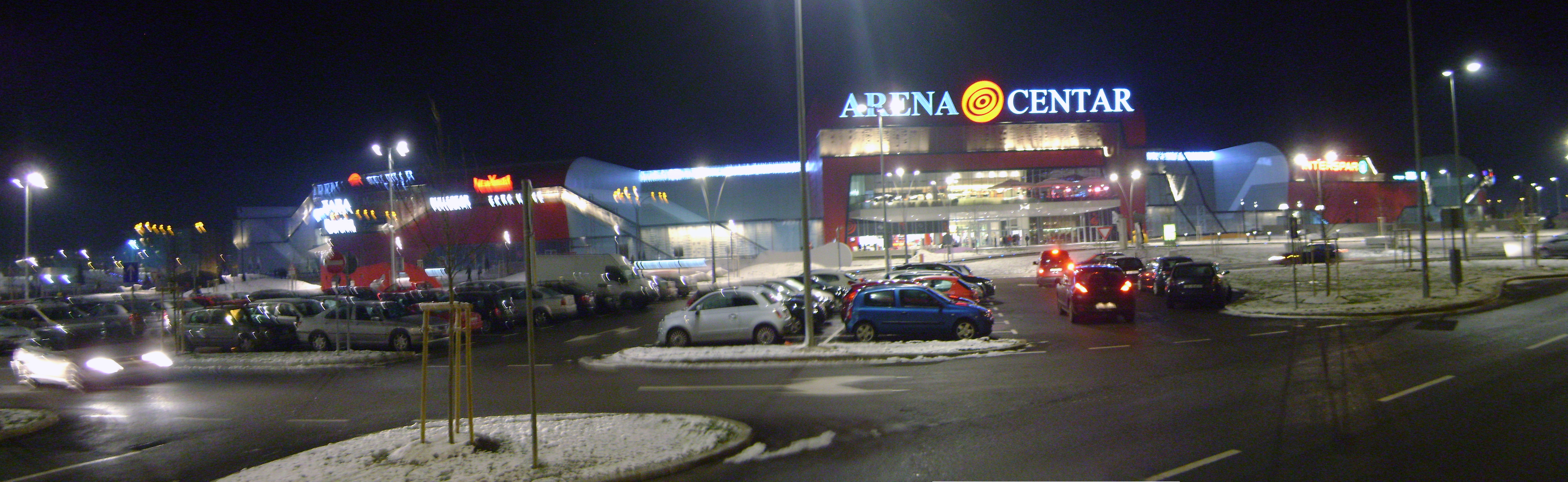
- Interactive map of Lanište, Croatia

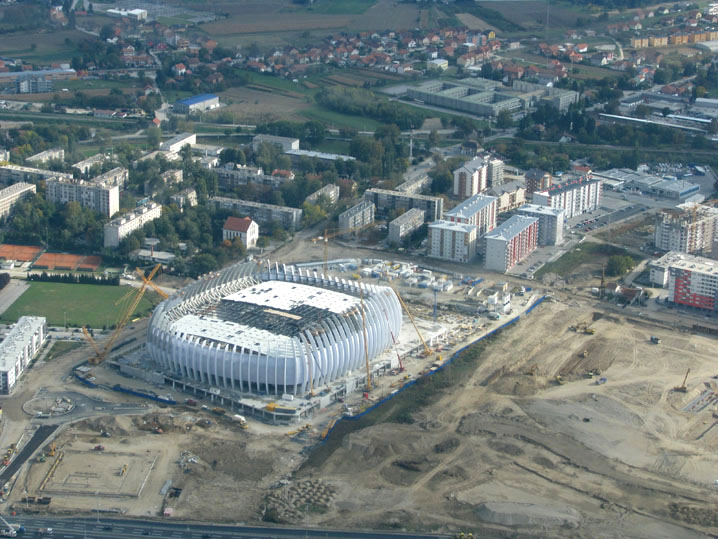
Aerial view of Arena Zagreb construction site

Lanište is a neighborhood in the Novi Zagreb - zapad city district in Zagreb, Croatia. It is located along the Jadranska Avenue, south of the Sava River, across from the neighbourhood of Jarun. It has a population of 3,468.

Its main thoroughfares are Jadranska Avenue, Lanište Road and Remetinečka Road. It is the site of the Arena Zagreb, and Arena shopping center.

The area was neglected for a long time, but in the last few years many new apartment buildings were built, and real estate prices have risen considerably.

The neighborhood is badly connected to the Zagreb tram system, with residents having to walk to Western Rotary to board the trams. A tram line extension together with a new rail yard located near Blato, southwest of Lanište, is planned.
