= Interliber =

Annual book fair in Zagreb, Croatia

Interliber International Book and Teaching Appliances Fair

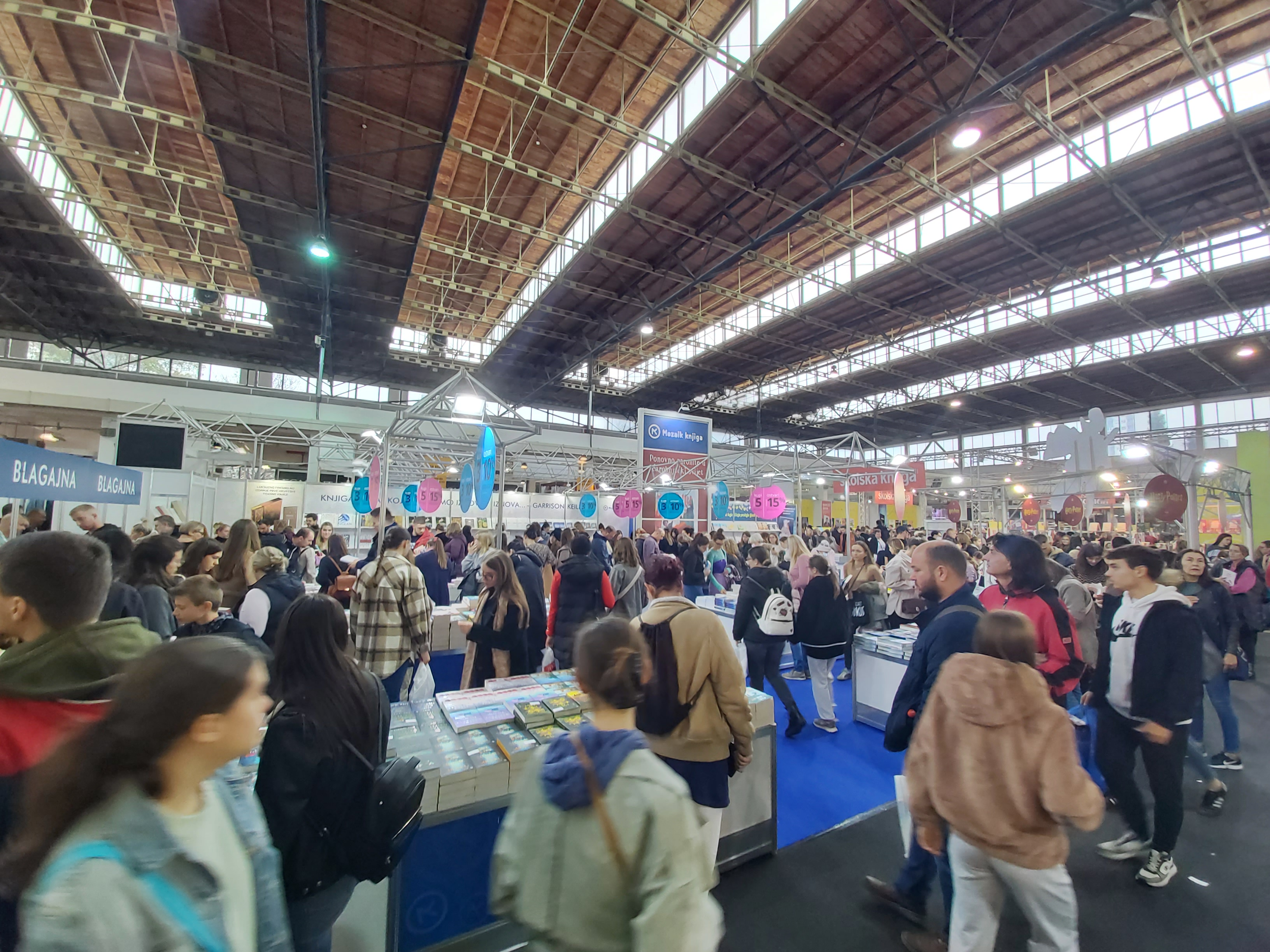
- Interliber 2022
- Status: Active
- Genre: Multi-genre
- Venue: Zagreb Fair grounds
- Location: Zagreb
- Country: Croatia
- Inaugurated: 1977
- Attendance: 130,000 (2014)
- Website: zv.hr

The Interliber - International Book and Teaching Appliances Fair (Croatian: Interliber - Međunarodni sajam knjiga i učila) is the largest Croatian trade fair for books and teaching appliances.

It is held annually in mid-November at the Zagreb Fair grounds in Zagreb, Croatia.

Representatives from book publishing and multimedia companies from all over the world come to the Interliber in order to present their products to the general public.
