= Remetinec Roundabout =

Coordinates: 45°46′38″N 15°57′10″E

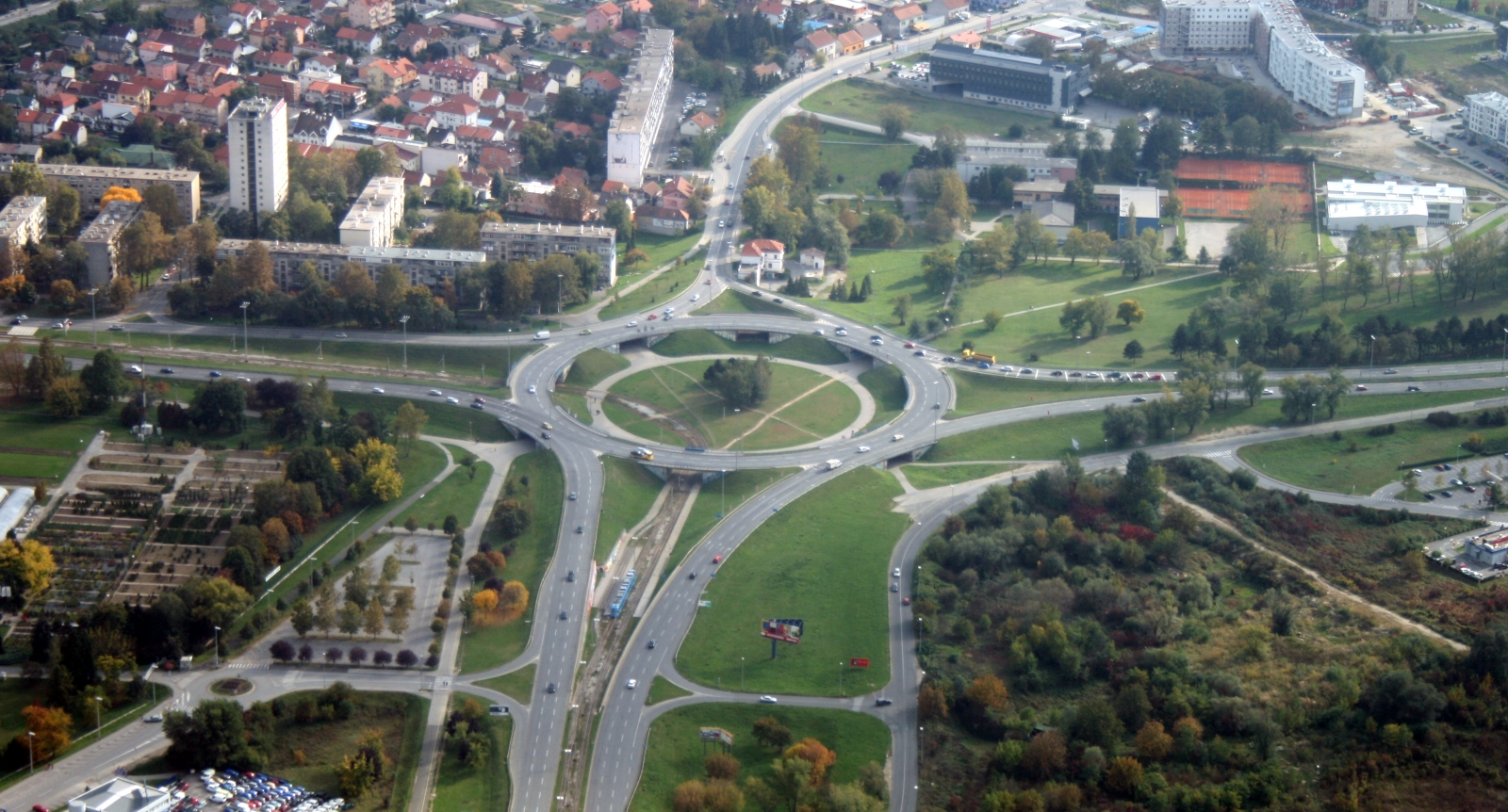
Roundabout in west Novi Zagreb

The Remetinec Roundabout (Croatian: Remetinečki rotor, Zapadni rotor or simply Rotor) is a large roundabout in the Novi Zagreb – zapad part of Zagreb, Croatia. Having three lanes, with an outer radius of 74 metres (243 ft), it connects Adriatic Bridge, Jadranska Avenue, Dubrovnik Avenue, and Remetinec Road. Inside traffic has the right of way, but the rightmost approaching lanes from the north, east and southwest are separated from the exiting traffic, reducing congestion for those three immediate right turns. The roundabout itself is elevated from the ground level and two tram lines and several pedestrian tracks pass underneath it.

More than 100,000 vehicles per day pass through the roundabout, which is twice its normal capacity. Congestion is particularly severe during the rush hour. Due to the volume of traffic, accidents are almost an everyday occurrence. More than 2,700 accidents with 216 injuries were registered in the roundabout between 1997 and 2006, making it one of the city's most dangerous intersections.

A traffic study commissioned by the City of Zagreb in 2007 proposed five reconstruction options. The option proposed in 2009 and ultimately accepted is based on construction of two east–west-bound tunnels, reducing the load on the roundabout to 38,000 vehicles per day. The reconstruction began in the summer of 2018 and is expected to be open for traffic on 9 January 2020.
