= Hrvatski Leskovac =

- Village
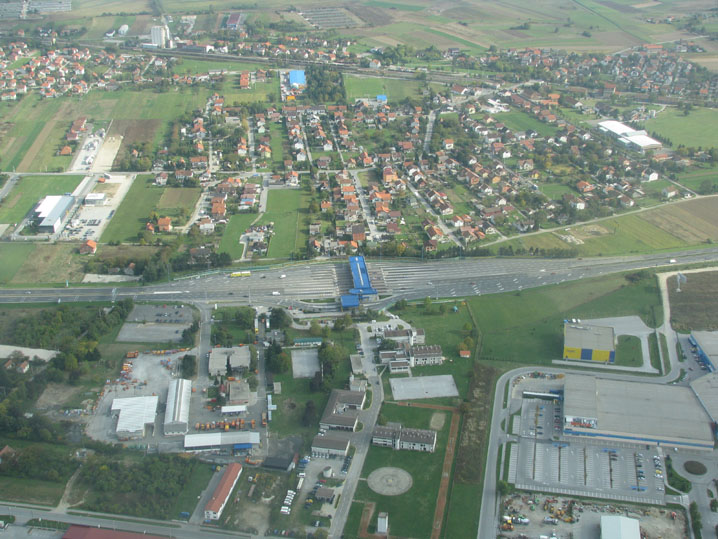
- Interactive map of Hrvatski Leskovac
- Location within Croatia
- Coordinates: 45°44′40″N 15°53′30″E
- Country: Croatia
- County: City of Zagreb
- City District: Novi Zagreb – zapad

Area
  - Total: 1.3 sq mi (3.3 km^{2})

Population (2021)
  - Total: 2,659
  - Density: 2,100/sq mi (810/km^{2})
- Time zone: UTC+1 (CET)
  - Summer (DST): UTC+2 (CEST)

Hrvatski Leskovac is a settlement in the City of Zagreb county, Croatia.

== Name ==
The village name used to be Kajkavian Leskovec, but was changed to Shtokavian Leskovac, and the prefix Hrvatski was added to distinguish it from the Serbian city of Leskovac.

== Demographics ==
According to the 2021 census, its population was 2,659. As of 2011, it had a population of 2,687. It is connected by the D1 highway.

In 2019, the settlement's first primary school opened.

== Sports ==
It is also home to a football club, NK Hrvatski Leskovac.
