= Botinec =

- Village
- Location within Croatia
- Country: Croatia
- County: City of Zagreb
- City District: Novi Zagreb – zapad

Area
  - Total: 0.12 sq mi (0.3 km^{2})

Population (2021)
  - Total: 4
  - Density: 35/sq mi (13/km^{2})
- Time zone: UTC+1 (CET)
  - Summer (DST): UTC+2 (CEST)

Botinec is a neighborhood located in Novi Zagreb - zapad city district of Zagreb, Croatia.

It is famous for having its streets named after famous characters from Croatian theater plays and novels. It was founded in 1965 as a refugee camp after the 1964 flood, owing its rectangular street grid to the era of building Novi Zagreb (called Južni Zagreb – Southern Zagreb at the time). It was away from the city and away from Sava River, with barracks meant to serve as a camp only for up to six years, but the houses were eventually bought by the tenants and upgraded. Nonetheless, Botinec remains a neighborhood bearing the scar of the flood. Botinec is divided in two parts: Old Botinec and New Botinec.

== Climate ==
Between 1981 and 2016, the highest temperature recorded at the local weather station was 41.0 °C (105.8 °F), on 8 August 2013. The coldest temperature was −27.5 °C (−17.5 °F), on 17 January 1963.

== Demographics ==
According to the 2021 census, its population was only 4.

According to the 2001 census, Botinec had 4,906 inhabitants.

== Church of St. Stephen the First Martyr ==
In the neighbourhood exists Church of St. Stephen the First Martyr, which is a Catholic parish church, built in 1969.

The Zagreb-Botinec Parish, to which the church belongs, was formed by separation from the Zagreb-Remetinec-Blato Parish in 1969 by decree of Cardinal Franjo Kuharić.

The parish church is located in the basement of two connected family houses that were built in 1969.

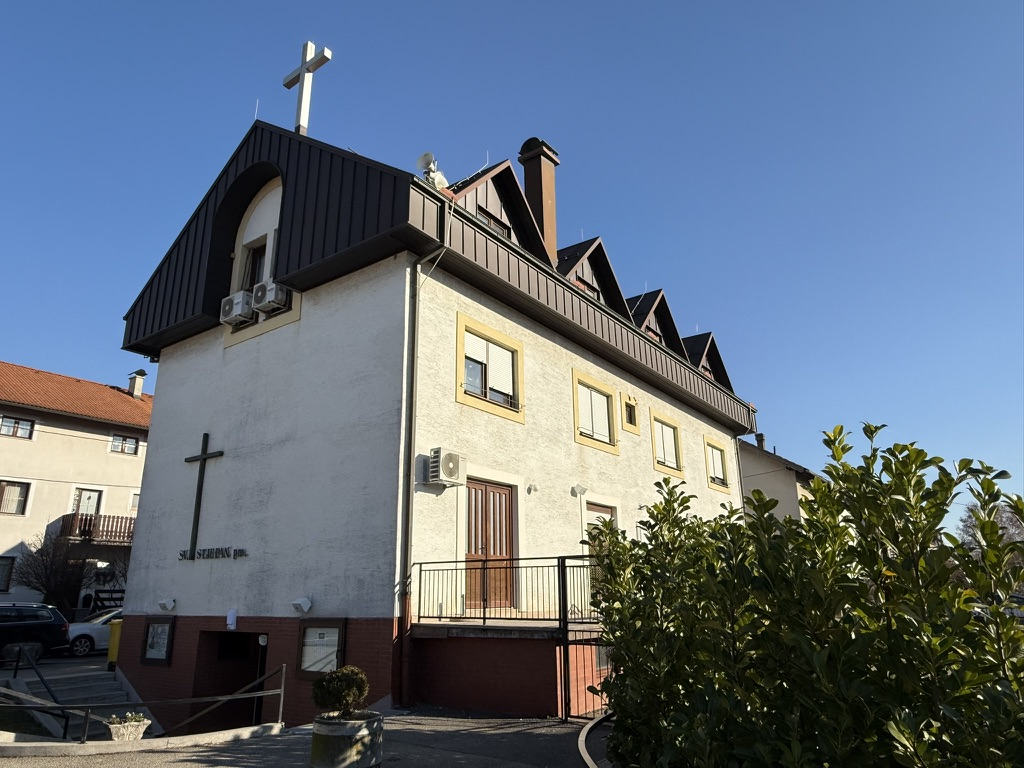
View of the church

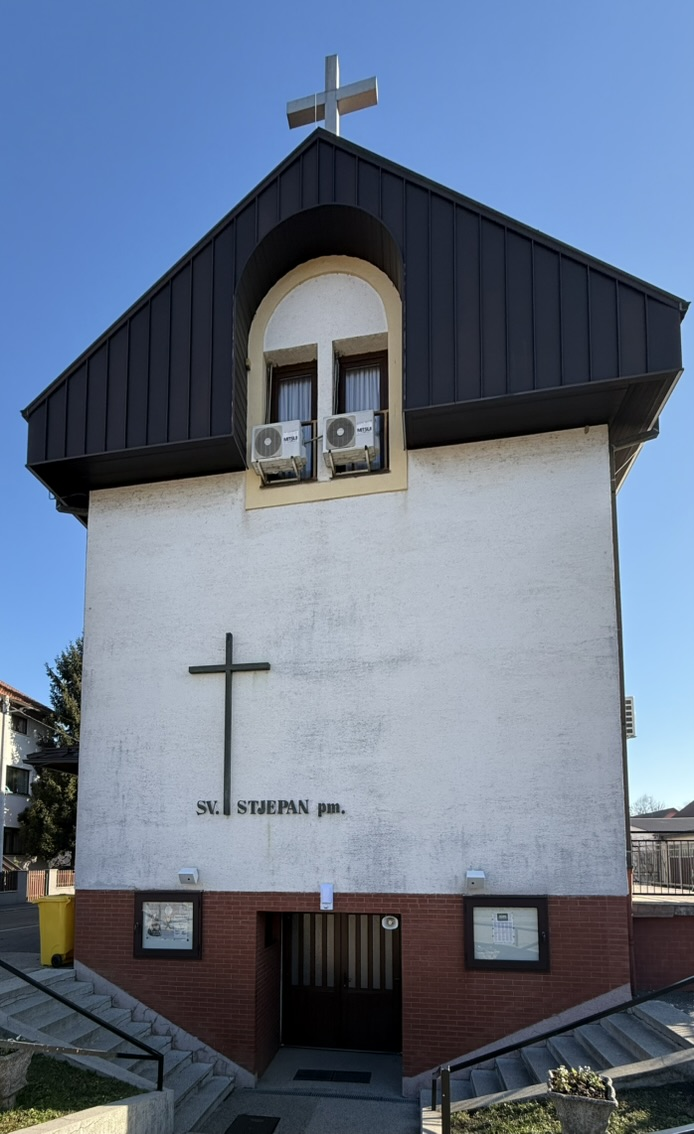
View of the church
