= Novi Zagreb – zapad =

City district of Zagreb, Croatia

Coordinates: 45°46′7.15″N 15°57′10.40″E

- District of Zagreb
- Novi Zagreb - zapad as a part of Zagreb
- Country: Croatia
- County/City: Zagreb

Government
  - Council President: Nebojša Aleksić (M!-SDP)
  - District Council: Composition (19): M!-SDP (10); HDZ-DP-HSU-HSS (3); Marija Selak Raspudić list (3); Only Croatia-DOMiNO-HS-Blok (1); Pavle Kalinić-ZDS list (1); Davor Bernardić list (1)

Area
  - Total: 62.639 km^{2} (24.185 sq mi)

Population (2021)
  - Total: 63,917
  - Density: 1,020.4/km^{2} (2,642.8/sq mi)

Map

Novi Zagreb – zapad (Croatian pronunciation: [nôʋiː zǎːgreb zâːpad], "Novi Zagreb – west") has the status of a city district (Croatian: gradska četvrt) in Zagreb, Croatia and as such has an elected council.

According to the 2011 Croatian census, Novi Zagreb – zapad had 58,103 residents.

== List of neighborhoods in Novi Zagreb – zapad ==
- Blato: recently assimilated in the Zagreb agglomeration
- Botinec: famous for its streets that are named after Croatian fictional characters
- Hrašće
- Hrvatski Leskovac
- Kajzerica
- Lanište
- Lučko
- Remetinec
- Savski gaj: neighborhood with one skyscraper, few buildings and mostly single-family houses.
- Siget: high-quality soc-realistic buildings with small private houses
- Sveta Klara
- Trnsko
- Trokut

== See also ==
- Novi Zagreb
