= Adriatic Bridge =

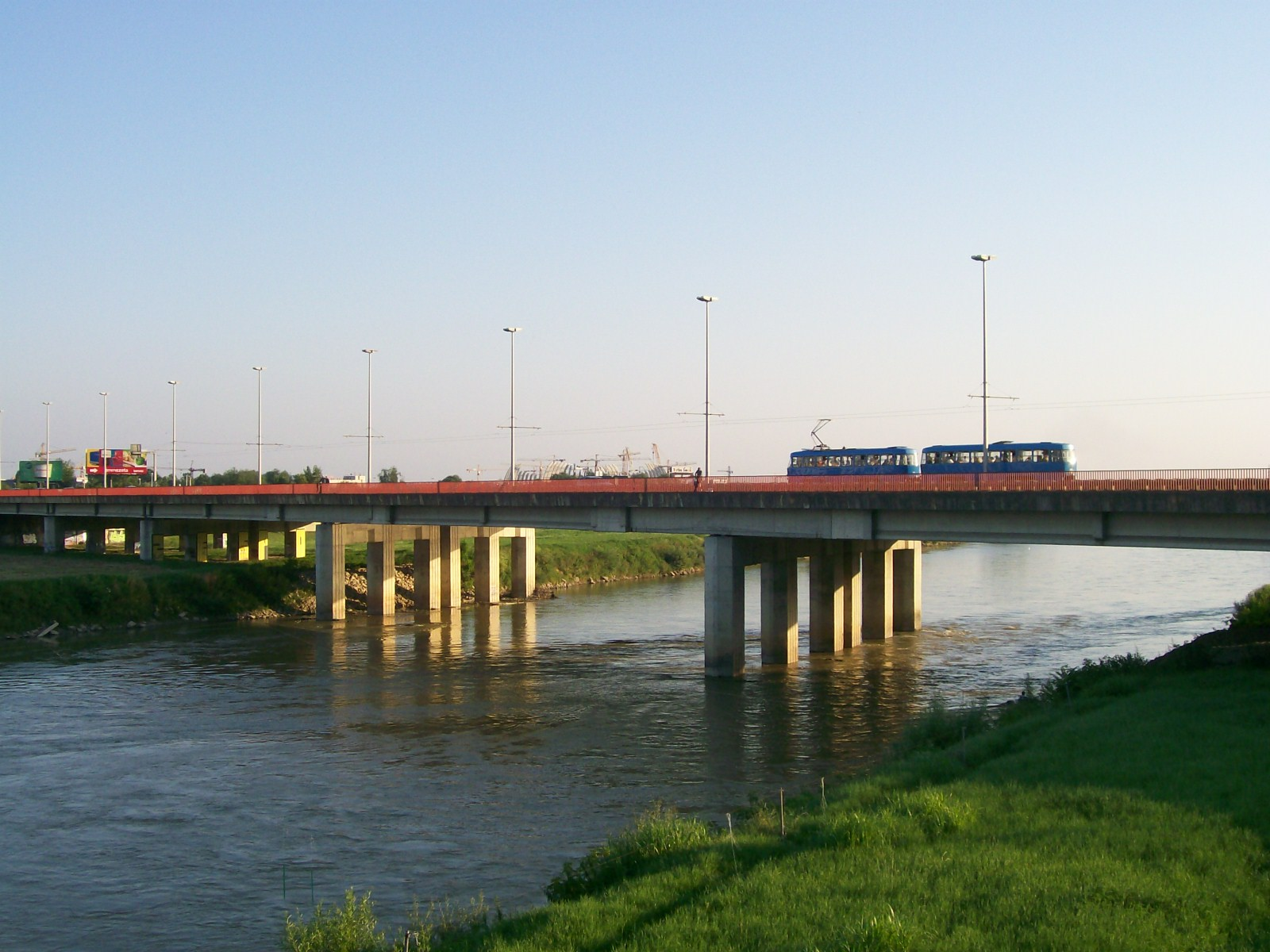
- Adriatic Bridge from northern embankment
- Coordinates: 45°47′00″N 15°57′07″E
- Carries: 6 lanes of traffic, 2 tram tracks, 2 pedestrian lanes
- Crosses: Sava River
- Locale: southwest Zagreb, Croatia
- Official name: Jadranski most

Characteristics
- Design: girder bridge
- Total length: 313.7 m (1,029 ft)
- Width: 36.8 m (121 ft)
- Longest span: 63 m (207 ft)

History
- Opened: 1981

Location
- Interactive map of Adriatic Bridge

Adriatic Bridge (Croatian: Jadranski most) is a six-lane road, tram, and pedestrian girder bridge over the Sava River in Zagreb, Croatia. It was designed by Zvonimir Lončarić and built in 1981. The bridge is a seven-span structure with a total length of 313.7 m, with access viaducts on both sides.

== Characteristics ==
The bridge contains 3 traffic lanes of 3.5 m each for vehicle crossing, 2 lanes for trams of 3.5 m each, and 2 lanes of 2 m each for pedestrians between the main outer railing of the bridge and the protective railing on the bridge. The end cornices are 2 × 0.25 = 0.5 m, the middle 2 × 0.35 = 0.7 m, the protective strip 4 × 0.65 m = 2.6 m and the buffers 2 × 0.5 = 1 m, a total of 36.8 m on the southern (unexpanded) side of the bridge. The static system of the structure is a continuous girder on freely rotating bearings of a constant height of 2.4 m. The ratio of height to span of the structure is 1:26.
