= Blato, Zagreb =

Neighbourhood of Zagreb, Croatia

- Neighbourhood
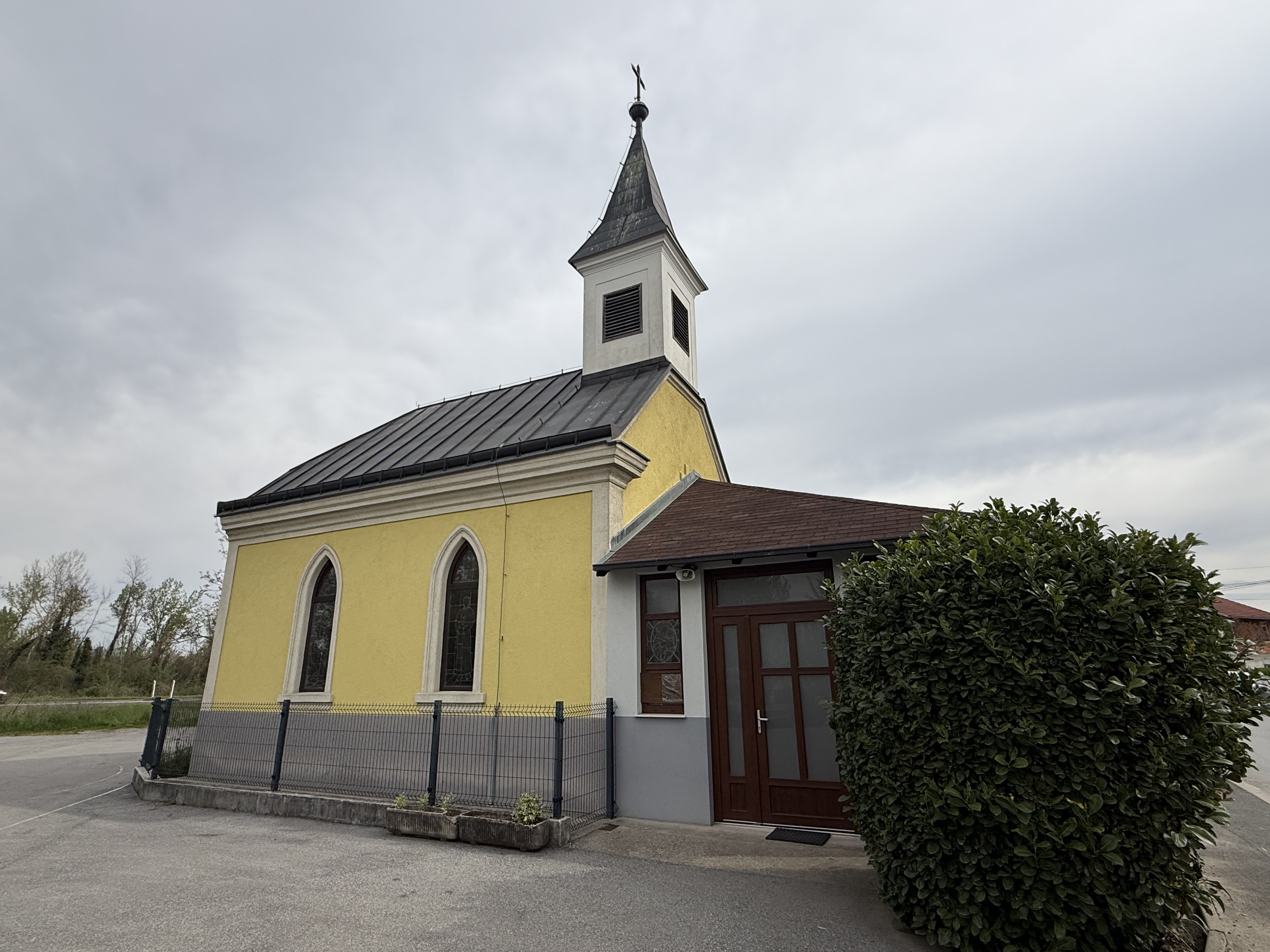
- Chapel of Our Lady of the Snows
- Interactive map of Blato, Zagreb
- Coordinates: 45°45′50″N 15°55′23″E
- Country: Croatia
- City: Zagreb
- District: Novi Zagreb - zapad

Population (2011)
  - Total: 2,553

Blato is a neighborhood located in the Novi Zagreb - zapad city district of Zagreb, Croatia. It is spread along the Karlovačka Road, south of Jadranska Avenue. The population is 2,553 (2011).

Formerly a village on its own, it has been assimilated into the Zagreb agglomeration during the 20th century. The Sava-Odra canal was built in the southwest of Blato in 1979. It consists of single family homes and occasional duplex houses.
