= Zagreb Fair =

Exhibition venue in Zagreb, Croatia

Zagreb Fair Zagrebački velesajam
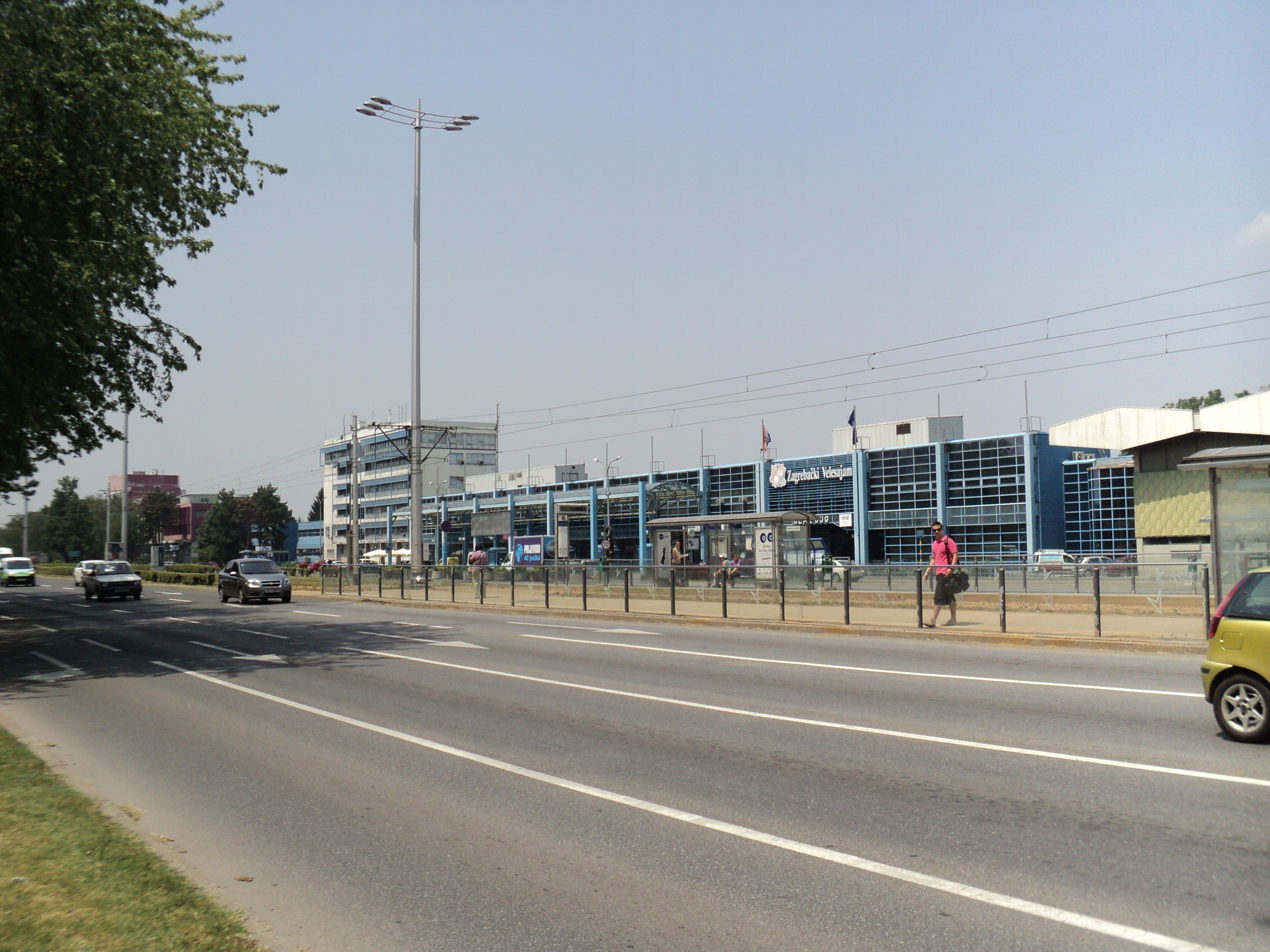
- Founded: 1909 (as Zagrebački zbor); 1946 (as Zagrebački velesajam)
- Headquarters: Zagreb, Croatia
- Parent: Zagreb Holding (2006–2014)
- Website: www.zv.hr

Zagreb Fair (Croatian: Zagrebački velesajam) is a complex of exhibition pavilions in Zagreb, Croatia. The company which operates the venue carries the same name. The Zagreb Fair is the main venue in Zagreb for trade shows and fairs. Every year more than 25 specialised events are held at the venue, attended by more than 6,000 participants from 50 countries. Apart from trade fairs it is also used as a convention center.

== History ==
The history of trade fairs in Zagreb dates back to 1242 when the Hungarian king Bela IV issued a Golden Bull declaring Zagreb a free royal city and granting it the right to hold fairs. The first international exhibition in Zagreb was held in 1864. Zagreb Assembly (Croatian: Zagrebački zbor), the predecessor to Zagreb Fair, was founded by a group of Croatian businessmen, including Ferdinand Budicki and Samuel David Alexander. The Assembly was one of the co-founding institutions of The Global Association of the Exhibition Industry in 1925.

In June 1941 the Croatian fascist, ultranationalist Ustaše regime established a transit camp for Yugoslav Jews in the area. Most were placed in what used to be the French Pavilion and 2 neighboring ones. From there, in June–August 1941 the Ustaše shipped 2,500 Jews to the Ustaše death camps at Gospić-Jadovno-Pag Island

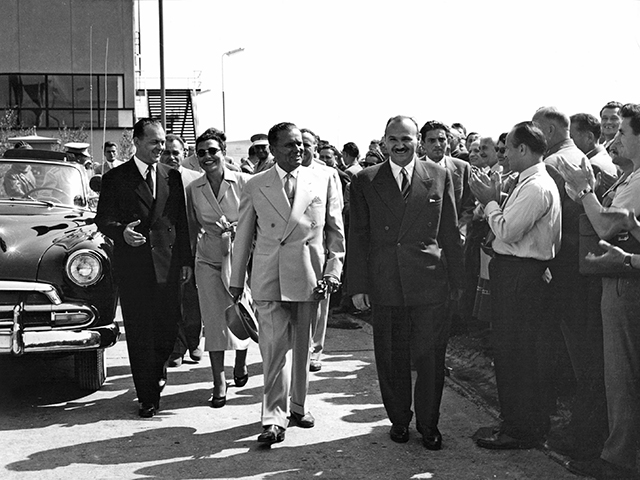
President of Yugoslavia Josip Broz Tito and first lady Jovanka Broz at the opening of the 51'st fair in 1956

At the ascent of the communist regime, in 1946, Zagreb Assembly was disbanded and its property and role was taken over by the newly incorporated Zagreb Fair. The Zagreb Fair was also the first fair held in post-World War II Yugoslavia in 1947. In 1956 it was relocated to the newly constructed Novi Zagreb part of the city south of the river Sava.

Since 1977, it is venue of the well-known Interliber annual book fair.

It was venue for the competitions in fencing at the 1999 Military World Games, hosted by Zagreb.

During the European migrant crisis in 2015, when over 39,000 migrants from the Middle East, South Asia and Africa entered Croatia, the fairgrounds served as an acceptance center housing over 1,200 migrants.

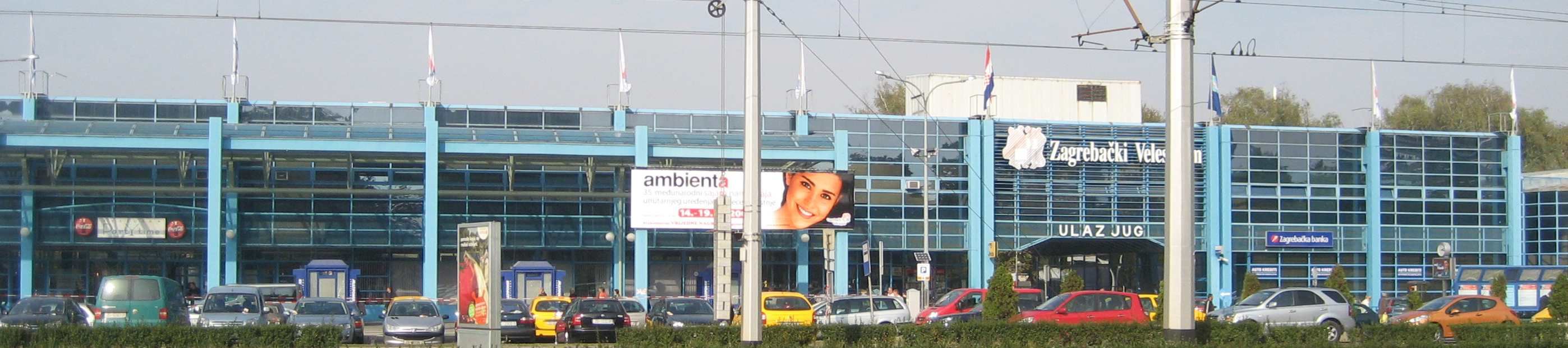
Panoramic view of main entrance (2008)
