= Dubrovnik Avenue =

Avenue in Zagreb, Croatia

Coordinates: 45°46′38″N 15°58′21″E

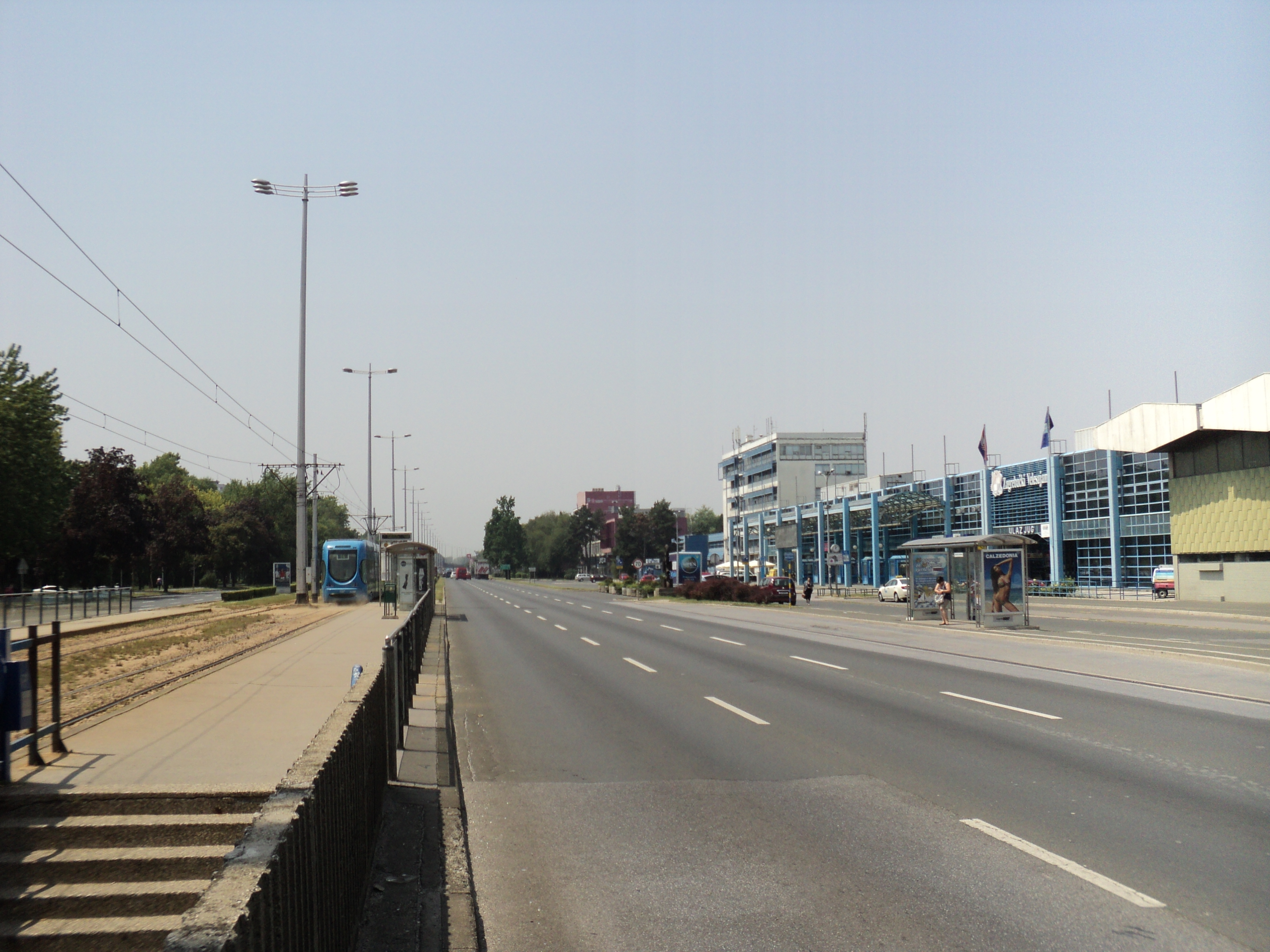
Dubrovnik Avenue at Zagreb Fair

Dubrovnik Avenue (Croatian: Avenija Dubrovnik) is an avenue located in the Novi Zagreb part of Zagreb, Croatia. It is mostly six or eight lanes wide. Built in the mid-1950s, it runs for 4 kilometers between the roundabout beneath the southward extension of the Youth Bridge (Most mladosti) in the east and the Remetinec Roundabout in the west of Novi Zagreb. Its most important intersections are those with Većeslav Holjevac Avenue and Federal Republic of Germany Street. Being the main east–west thoroughfare of Novi Zagreb, more than 40,000 commuters travel on it daily.

== Buildings ==
The multiple pavilions hosting the Zagreb Fair are located on the street. Additionally, the First Gymnasium is on 36 Dubrovnik Avenue.
