= 1964 Zagreb flood =

Flood in Zagreb, Yugoslavia

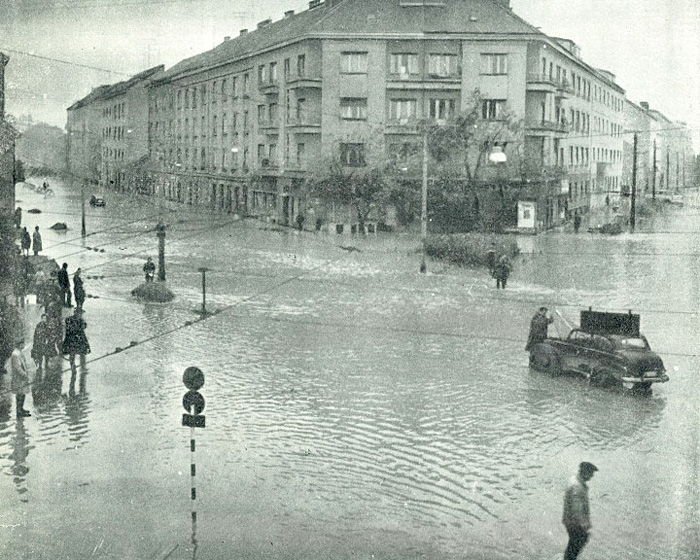
- Water on Tratinska and Kranjčevićeva Street, Trešnjevka
- Date: 25–26 October 1964
- Location: Zagreb, Yugoslavia
- Deaths: 17 direct
- Property damage: 160 billion Yugoslav dinars > US$100 million

On 25 October 1964, a devastating flood of the River Sava struck Zagreb, SR Croatia, SFR Yugoslavia. High rainfall upriver caused rivers and streams in the Sava catchment basin to swell and spill over their banks in many places throughout Slovenia and northern Croatia. The worst of the flooding occurred in Zagreb. Sava floods were a known hazard in the city, having affected the development of the area since the Roman times, and the 1964 flood did not have the largest extent. However, it occurred following several decades of large-scale industrialisation and urban growth which had caused the city to expand into the most flood-vulnerable areas. The quality of building construction and flood defences in the floodplain was mostly low. Regulation of the Sava and its tributaries upriver from Zagreb cut off many natural detention basins, such as fields and pastures, which caused water to pile up ahead of the city. To make matters worse, the soil was already saturated from a mid-month episode of fairly high rainfall. A second episode of high rainfall, during 22–25 October upriver in Slovenia, produced a record-high water wave in the Sava. At Zagreb's Sava River gauge, the water crested at 514 cm (16 ft 10 in) above zero level, exceeding the previous high water mark by more than half a metre (2 ft). This proved too much for the city's embankments. Around 60 km^{2} (23 sq mi) of the city was flooded, including most neighbourhoods on the western side of the floodplain.

The worst-stricken areas were the working-class suburbs of Trnje and Trešnjevka. A network of arterial roads raised on small embankments failed to hold the water. In some areas single-storey houses were submerged whole. The onset of the flood was quick, the warnings came late and the intensity and height of the flood was not communicated to the residents in time. Many were unable to save their belongings and ended up stranded in attics and on the rooftops. The brunt of the flood lasted from 25 to 28 October as the water progressed through the city from west to east, mostly on the more populous left (northern) bank. The neighbourhoods on the right bank only saw groundwater flooding for the most part. The railway embankment and sandbag dykes successfully protected the northern and eastern part of the floodplain, and Donji grad and much of Peščenica were spared. A total of 17 people died in the flood. The living quarters of 183,000 people were flooded; 40,000 of these lost their homes. The damage was estimated to 160 billion Yugoslav dinars, or, alternatively, over US$100 million.

The flood was followed by urban redevelopment, changing Zagreb's cityscape. Around 26,000 new flats and houses were constructed in the next four years. The challenge of housing flood refugees led to the creation of several new planned neighbourhoods. Existing neighbourhoods where much of the housing had been condemned due to water damage were rebuilt, often as high-rise housing estates. Several factories were moved eastward from the flood-prone central part of the city. The disaster also prompted a rework of the flood defences on the Sava. The Sava embankments in Zagreb were reconstructed, raised and lengthened, and the river was channelised throughout the city. Diversion canals were built around several cities in the Sava basin, including the Sava–Odra–Sava Canal bypassing Zagreb. As a result, although there have been several destructive Sava Valley floods since 1964, their effects in Zagreb were limited to groundwater flooding in a few streets. However, changes in the riverbed are believed to have somewhat decreased the effectiveness of the defences as of the early 21st century.

== Background ==
=== Geography and hydrology ===
Located in northwest Croatia near the border with Slovenia, Zagreb's geography is largely defined by two features: the Medvednica Mountain whose foothills contain the city's historic core and northern suburbs, and the River Sava floodplain to the south, which contains most of the city, including the post-19th-century city centre, Donji grad. Originating in Slovenia, the Sava drains much of Slovenia and northern Croatia. It is the Danube's biggest tributary by discharge. The river exhibits a nivo-pluvial regime. The water level peaks with spring snowmelt and autumn rains, while the minimums occur in summer and winter. The autumn peak is more pronounced in the Sava's upper course. Due to the low permeability of the hilly and mountainous terrain of Slovenia and northwest Croatia, the river exhibits a high seasonal flow variability, exacerbating the risk of flooding. Before the river regulation works at the turn of the 20th century, Sava's flow in Zagreb was described as "torrential".

The average annual discharge at the Zagreb gauging station is around 300 cubic metres per second (11,000 cu ft/s), while flows over 1,000 m^{3}/s (35,000 cu ft/s) occur on a yearly basis. Average yearly precipitation over the Sava's upper course in Slovenia measures 1,570 millimetres (61.8 in), contributing the largest part of the Sava's water over its entire course. High rainfall events can increase water level in the Sava and its tributaries to flood levels within days. The location of the city on a transition from hilly to flat terrain increases flood risk. The Sava flows at an incline of 1 per cent through Zagreb, but between Rugvica (about 20 km or 12 mi east of the city core) and Sisak, the river is highly sinuous with sharp meanders, and flows on a nearly flat terrain with an incline of 0.05 per cent. The latter part sustains much lower flows than the former, which can cause the water to pile up upstream.

Numerous torrential streams on the Medvednica Mountain pose an additional flood risk. The Medveščak stream caused the city's deadliest natural disaster in 1651, when a flash flood swept away houses in Tkalčićeva Street, killing 52 people. The most recent notable flash flooding event occurred in 2020. Floods of the Sava in Zagreb have been recorded since the antiquity. The development of Andautonia, a Roman town on the fringes of the modern-day city, was influenced by a devastating flood in early 2nd century AD. The first floods attested in modern records date back to 14th century. The first chronicled flood occurred in 1469. The twin cities of Kaptol and Gradec, which are located at the lower end of Medvednica foothills and form the core of modern-day Zagreb together with the adjacent Donji grad, controlled land in the floodplain on both banks of the Sava as early as the 13th century. This waterlogged area contained a few small villages and was mostly used for hunting, planting orchards and harvesting wood from willow trees as a construction material. The city was slow to expand since even the Donji grad area, which lies on the northern edge of the plain, was prone to flooding until it was artificially raised around the beginning of the 20th century. In the 19th century, floods would sometimes reach the bottom of the foothills, destroying houses in Ilica Street. Only with the 1850 unification of Kaptol and Gradec, which made financing flood defence projects possible, and the 1892 construction of the railway embankment which doubled as a flood barrier, did Zagreb's urban area begin to approach the river.

=== Suburban expansion into the floodplain ===
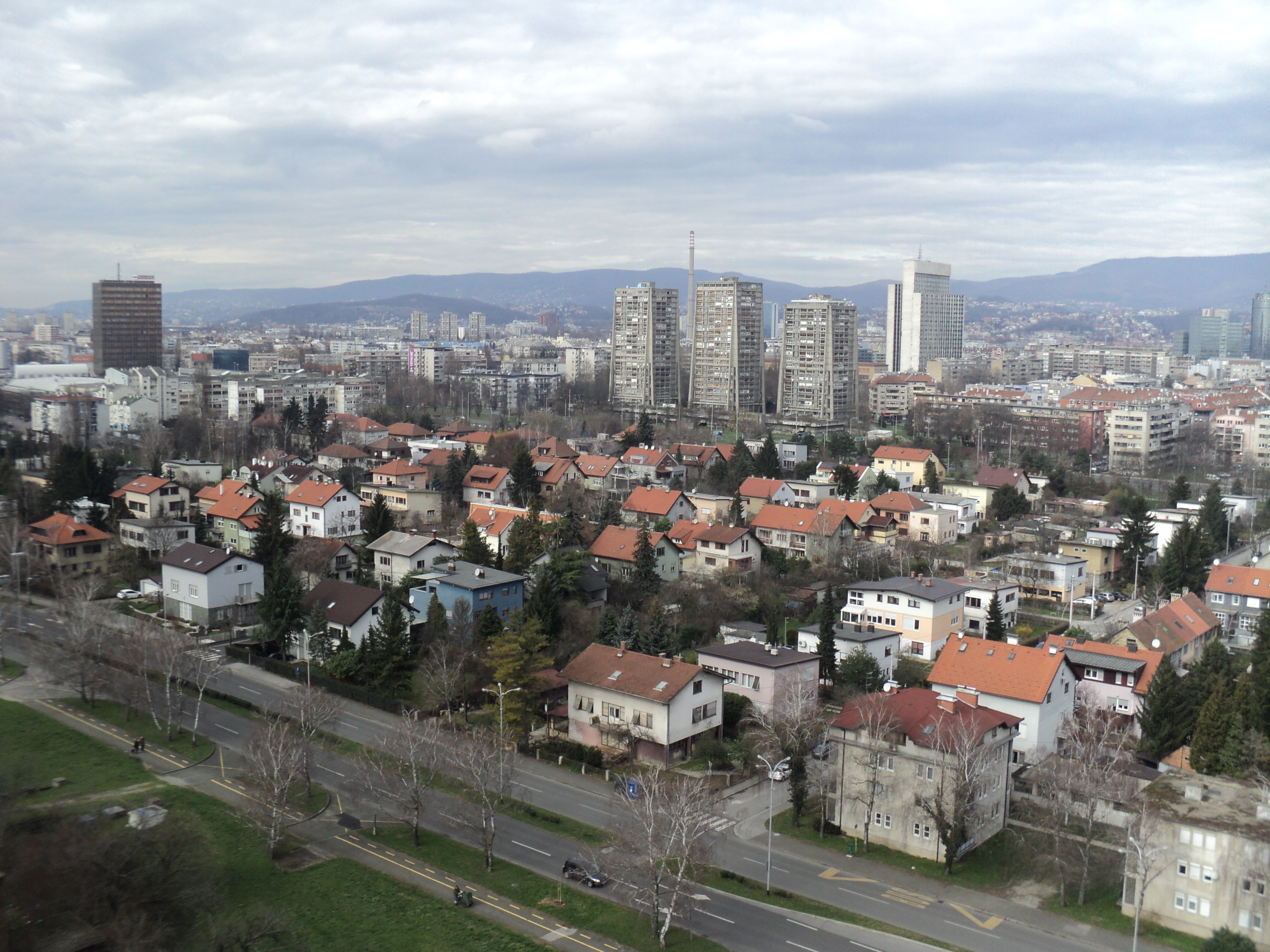
The planned neighbourhood of Cvjetno naselje is located close to the river. It is one of many new neighbourhoods which arose in the decades before the flood.

Industrialisation brought factories, whose number greatly increased after 1900. These were located near the railway, which divides the plain between Medvednica and the Sava into two parts. The land south of the railway had been largely owned by the Catholic Church until the land reform of 1918 which made it available for development, and it was settled in great numbers by factory workers, who migrated into the city from the countryside, constructing houses and shacks on small subdivided lots in the quickly growing suburbs of Trešnjevka, Trnje and Peščenica. Most dwellings were built without permits because underemployed factory workers could not afford the fees. Illegally constructed buildings were ineligible for insurance from flooding, which was a frequent occurrence in the new suburbs. Large floods occurred in 1876, twice in 1895, in 1923, 1925, 1926 and 1933, but smaller ones were almost a yearly occurrence.

In 1900, only 4,000 of Zagreb's 57,000 inhabitants lived in Trnje and Trešnjevka, while Peščenica had not yet been incorporated into the city. By the 1931 census, the population of Trešnjevka alone had grown to 21,350 residents, increasing the necessity and value of river regulation. The surroundings of the Sava, which had many meanders, oxbow lakes and islands, were partially protected when the river was channelised at the beginning of the 20th century. The oxbow lakes were fenced off by fascines. Work on flood defences was sporadic and of poor quality due to a scarcity of funding. An embankment protecting Trnje was partially built in 1924–25, but washed away by the November 1925 flood. By 1929 the central part of the suburbs was protected by an embankment, which was in the 1930s extended away from the river to Radnička Road in Peščenica in the east, and along the Črnomerec stream up to the northern border of Trešnjevka in the west. These defences were not enough to protect the city from the 1933 flood, when the Sava, at a height of 455 centimetres (14 ft 11 in), breached the embankments, causing flooding that lasted seven weeks. The embankments were mended and somewhat improved over the next several years, which were nevertheless marked by successive floods. Further works were carried out in 1945 and 1960–61 by youth work actions organised by the Communist government. Embankments were extended and flood defences improved in Trešnjevka, Trnje, and Peščenica. However, the embankments were still low and of poor construction quality, and protected only the central part of the city, leaving the flanks exposed.

Following World War II, the three suburbs were responsible for much of the city's high population growth. By 1961, Zagreb numbered 430,802 inhabitants; the population of Trešnjevka had surpassed Rijeka, Croatia's third most populous city. After a lull in construction following the war, late 1950s and early 1960s saw the creation of new neighbourhoods of apartment buildings, such as the prefabricated buildings in Voltino (Trešnjevka), Folnegovićevo naselje (Peščenica) and Trnjanska Savica, and the low-rise cohousing estate in Veslačka Street. The southern districts became home to new University of Zagreb faculty buildings, and industry complexes such as the Rade Končar factory in Trešnjevka and the Žitnjak industrial zone in Peščenica, while district heating was introduced with new thermoelectric and heat plants. However, living standards in general remained low; only 10 per cent of Trešnjevka's streets was paved in 1960. During Mayor Većeslav Holjevac's term, the city began to expand to the Sava's right bank, forming Novi Zagreb. Savski Gaj, the first planned neighbourhood in Novi Zagreb, was built in 1957. The Zagreb Fair was also moved from the city centre to its modern-day position in Novi Zagreb's Kajzerica near the Sava Bridge.

== Flooding ==
In late October 1964, the Sava's upper course in Slovenia was affected by heavy rains. Ljubljana saw 113.0 mm (4.45 in) of rainfall on 22–25 October; Sava Bohinjka's source received 101.3 mm (3.99 in) and Novo Mesto received 90.0 mm (3.54 in). Although the rainfall totals were several times lower than in the 1933 flood, river levels increased rapidly. During the afternoon and evening hours of 24 October, the gauge station in Radeče near Zidani Most, Slovenia (roughly halfway between Ljubljana and Zagreb) crested at 40 cm (16 in) less than the 1933 maximum, but this was preceded by a rise of nearly 6 m (20 ft) in a matter of hours. This rise was likely accelerated by the saturation of the drainage basin by moderate rainfall the previous week, which had produced a smaller water wave that ended up cresting at 304 cm (10 ft 0 in) in Zagreb on 16 October.

=== Timeline ===
==== 25 October ====
The flood began in the morning of 25 October. The undefended plain between Zaprešić and Samobor, directly upstream from the urban area, was the first to flood in the Zagreb metropolitan area. At 11:45, water topped the right-bank embankment opposite Podsused, on the westernmost fringes of Zagreb. One of the first urban neighbourhoods to be affected was Rudeš, in the western part of Trešnjevka, which was flooded by 14:00. The Tempo quarry near modern-day Lake Jarun was inundated around 15:30, when water breached makeshift dykes, and the company's cement supply was flooded. In the following hours the flood reached Jankomir, Lučko, Prečko, Vrbanov Put (today Vrbani) and Kajzerica. Kajzerica was on the right (southern) bank of the river and was protected by the embankment, but endangered by groundwaters. Further east, settlements near the river, such as Petruševec (Peščenica) and Drenje (right bank), were also inundated, since the embankments ended at the recently built Zagreb Thermoelectric Heat Plant near modern-day Savica Lakes and Folnegovićevo naselje.

By the evening, all the city's bridges were closed as the water neared the tops of the embankments. The embankments were initially defended by makeshift dykes made out of sandbags supplied by the city's construction companies, including 100,000 sandbags provided by Paromlin. The sandbags were used to raise the embankments and block the breaches near the Sava Bridge – the left embankment was breached near the Mladost sports facilities at 20:20 and in Veslačka Street at 22:00. At that point, the level at the Sava Bridge gauge was 460 cm (15 ft 1 in), slightly exceeding the high water of 1933, which had been the record high since the gauge became operational in November 1849. At 470 cm (15 ft 5 in), the water filled the southern half of Trešnjevka. This area included the neighbourhoods of Jarun and Knežija, west of Savska Road and south of today's Ljubljana Avenue (then part of the Ljubljana–Zagreb–Belgrade Highway, running east–west through Zagreb). These two roads were slightly elevated from the surrounding terrain and acted as barriers to the waters. At this point, the water was at the level of the crown of the embankments west of the Sava Bridge.

==== 26 October ====
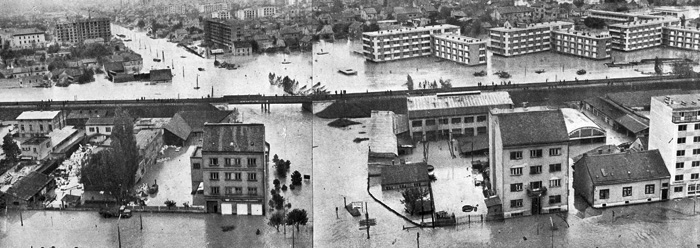
Flooded Trešnjevka from the Vjesnik Building. The Ljubljana–Zagreb Highway passes through the middle of the photo.

Initially, it seemed like the highway would withstand the flood, but as the water level rose to 500 cm (16 ft 5 in) at 04:00 (26 October) both it and the Savska Road were overcome. (Note: Kuzmić (2013, p. 19) states that water was flowing freely across Savska Road by 01:40 at a water level of 494 cm (16 ft 2 in), when the efforts to hold it back there were abandoned.) The floodwaters spread north throughout Trešnjevka and east into Trnje, beginning with Cvjetno naselje, towards the city centre, reaching the Proletarian Brigades Street (today Vukovar Street). The high water at the Sava Bridge gauge was reached at 08:00, reading 514 cm (16 ft 10 in), or 59 cm (23 in) higher than in 1933. At that time, much of Trešnjevka was flooded except for some areas north of today's Ozaljska Street (then part of Končar Street), and Voltino. Under the railway overpass near Stadion Kranjčevićeva, where the sandbags were stacked to protect the city centre, the water reached the height of the traffic signs. The Rade Končar factory in Voltino was at the edge of the flooded area and defended by over 2,000 factory workers and employees, and the army, over the following two days. The last remaining passable thoroughfare in Trešnjevka was a section of Samobor Road, an east–west street along the railway. On the western side of Trnje, University of Zagreb's Faculty of Humanities and Social Sciences building in Vrbik was flooded around 08:00–09:00. Surging from Trešnjevka, breaching the embankments west of the Sava Bridge and topping them near the Liberty Bridge where they were lower, the water enveloped most of Trnje. Trnje's northwestern corner, Martinovka, was flooded, while a part of the eastern neighbourhood of Kruge north of the highway remained dry. On 27 October, the eastern line of defence was Držić Street, west of Sigečica and Folnegovićevo naselje.

The northernmost extent of the flooded area was the railway embankment at the fringe of Donji grad, Zagreb's central district, where sandbag dykes at railway underpasses protected the city core. In some places in Donji grad the groundwaters rose through the sewers. Backflow destroyed machinery in the Josip Kraš biscuit factory on Branimir Street. The neighbouring Nada Dimić textile factory was saved by its workers, who plugged all sewer drains with sandbags in time to stop the flood.

==== 27–28 October ====
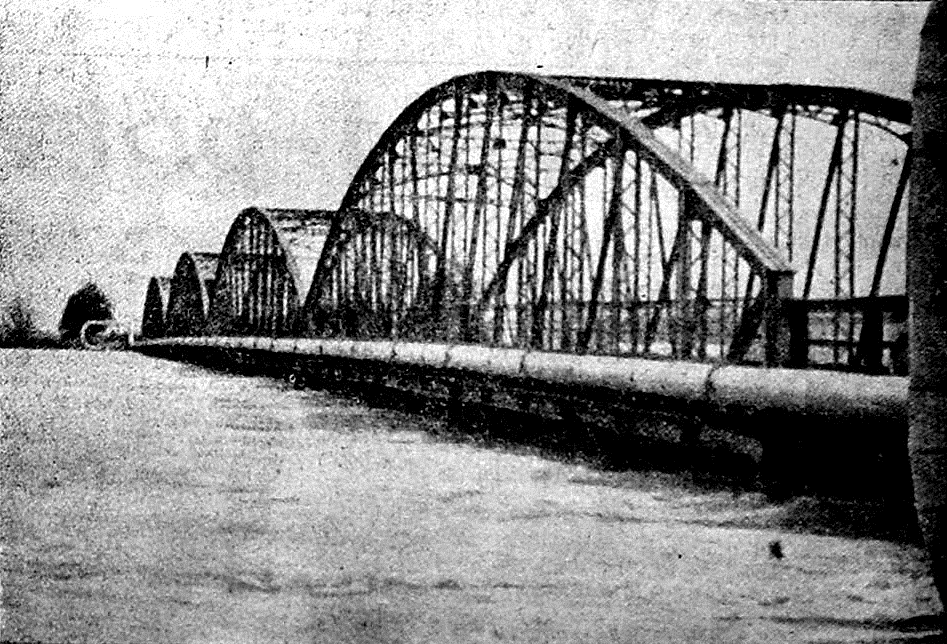
Jakuševec Bridge on 27 October

By 27 October, as the crest moved eastward, waters began to recede from the western areas, including the Samobor–Zaprešić plain and Trešnjevka. As the streets in Ljubljanica (Trešnjevka), north of the highway, became passable again, and Liberty Bridge and Končar Street were re-opened to bus and tram traffic, respectively, water rose on the eastern side of the city, where the defence line at the time ran along Držićeva Street. In the afternoon of 26 October, Trnjanska Savica was flooded and quickly found itself under 1.5 metres (5 ft) of water, while Folnegovićevo naselje and Sigečica were flooded by groundwaters. When water began to flow along Držićeva Street during the night of 27–28 October, endangering Kanal and inner city neighbourhoods to the north, channels were dug through the street with jackhammers, redirecting the water towards the Savica oxbow (today the Savica Lakes) and surrounding meadows. Water then began piling up against Radnička Road as the embankment of the rail spur for the heat plant prevented outflow from the Savica oxbow. The spur was dynamited in two places, after which the water relatively quickly receded from most of the flooded area.

On the right bank of the Sava, flooding was extensive in rural areas, reaching past Karlovac Road near Samobor and Lučko, upriver from Zagreb. Urban areas in Novi Zagreb were largely unaffected. Apart from Kajzerica, there was no flooding in the first two days of the flood, but in the night of 27–28 October rising groundwaters began to cause localised flooding in Trnsko, Trokut and Savski Gaj. Groundwater flooding on the right bank was worst in Blato. The Zagreb Fair, which was in the off-season used as a warehouse for factories, lies close to the Sava, and was also affected. The authorities, aided by local residents, evacuated machinery from the fairground buildings.

=== Extent of the flood in Zagreb ===
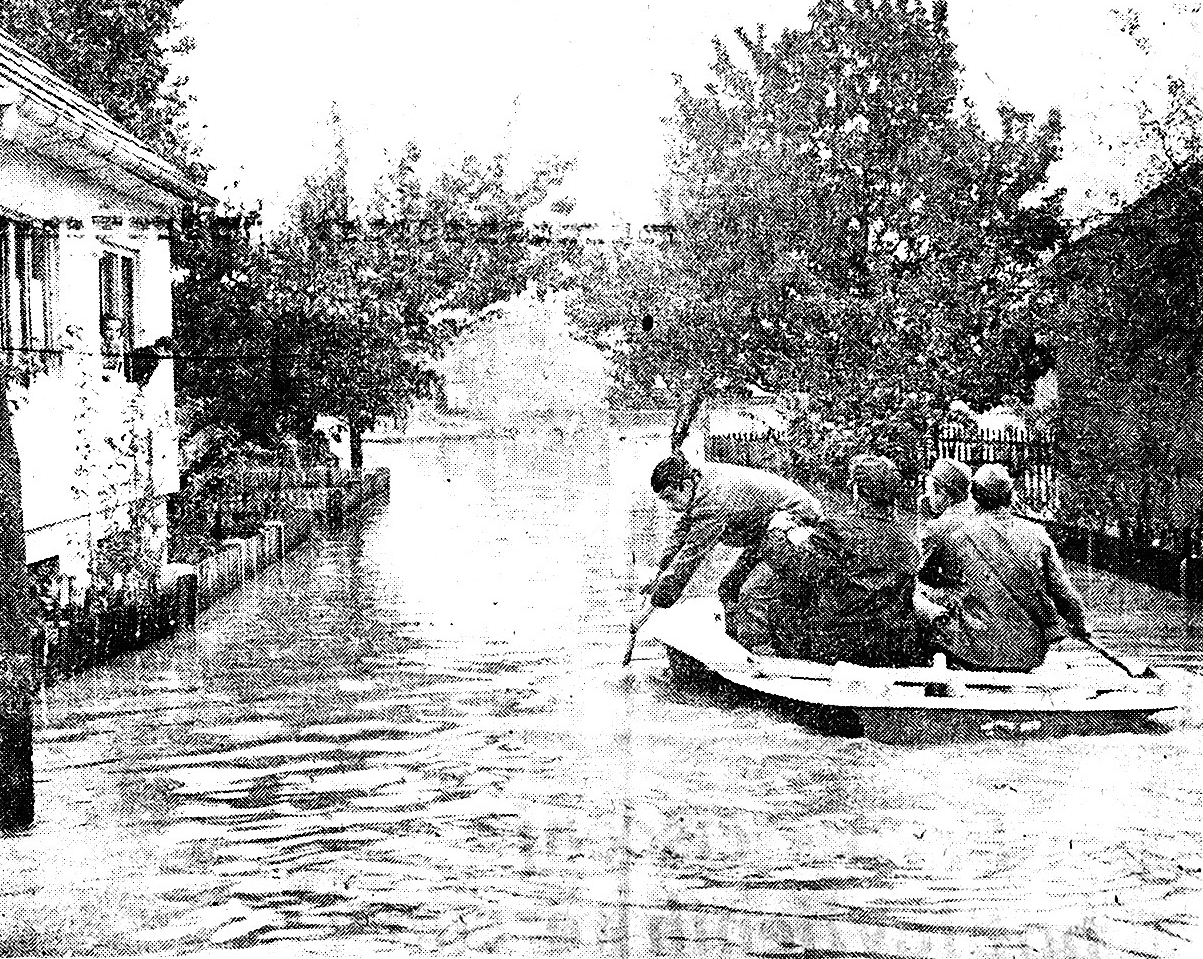
Boats were the only viable means of transport for days in much of the flooded area.

Since volumetric discharge was not directly measured in 1964 Zagreb, the peak flow can only be estimated based on the water level readings. Different sources estimate the peak flow at the height of the flood at 08:00 on 26 October to either 3,126 or 4,440 m^{3}/s (110,400 or 156,800 cu ft/s). (Note: Kuzmić (2013) and Hutinec & Goldstein (2013) write that 4,400 m^{3}/s (155,000 cu ft/s) is the most recent figure in scholarly sources. Marušić (2019) cites 3,126 m^{3}/s (110,390 cu ft/s) as the only figure for 1964.) The flooded area included more than half of Trešnjevka Municipality, much of Črnomerec Municipality, and parts of Remetinec and Peščenica municipalities. In much of this area, flooding was too deep for lorries, and travel was possible only by boat; citizens constructed makeshift rafts out of floating debris. During the night of 27–28 October, after the water started receding, the flooded area was estimated to encompass 56 km^{2} (22 sq mi). Despite the smaller amount of rainfall and the 40 cm lower crest at Radeče compared to the 1933 flood, the flood defences built in the intervening decades contributed to a much higher crest in Zagreb in 1964, at 117.40 m (385.2 ft) above sea level. Channelling and embankments built on the Sava and its tributaries Sutla and Krapina effectively fenced off farmland, marshes and open fields, which had previously functioned as natural detention basins that flattened the flood wave.

=== Outside Zagreb ===
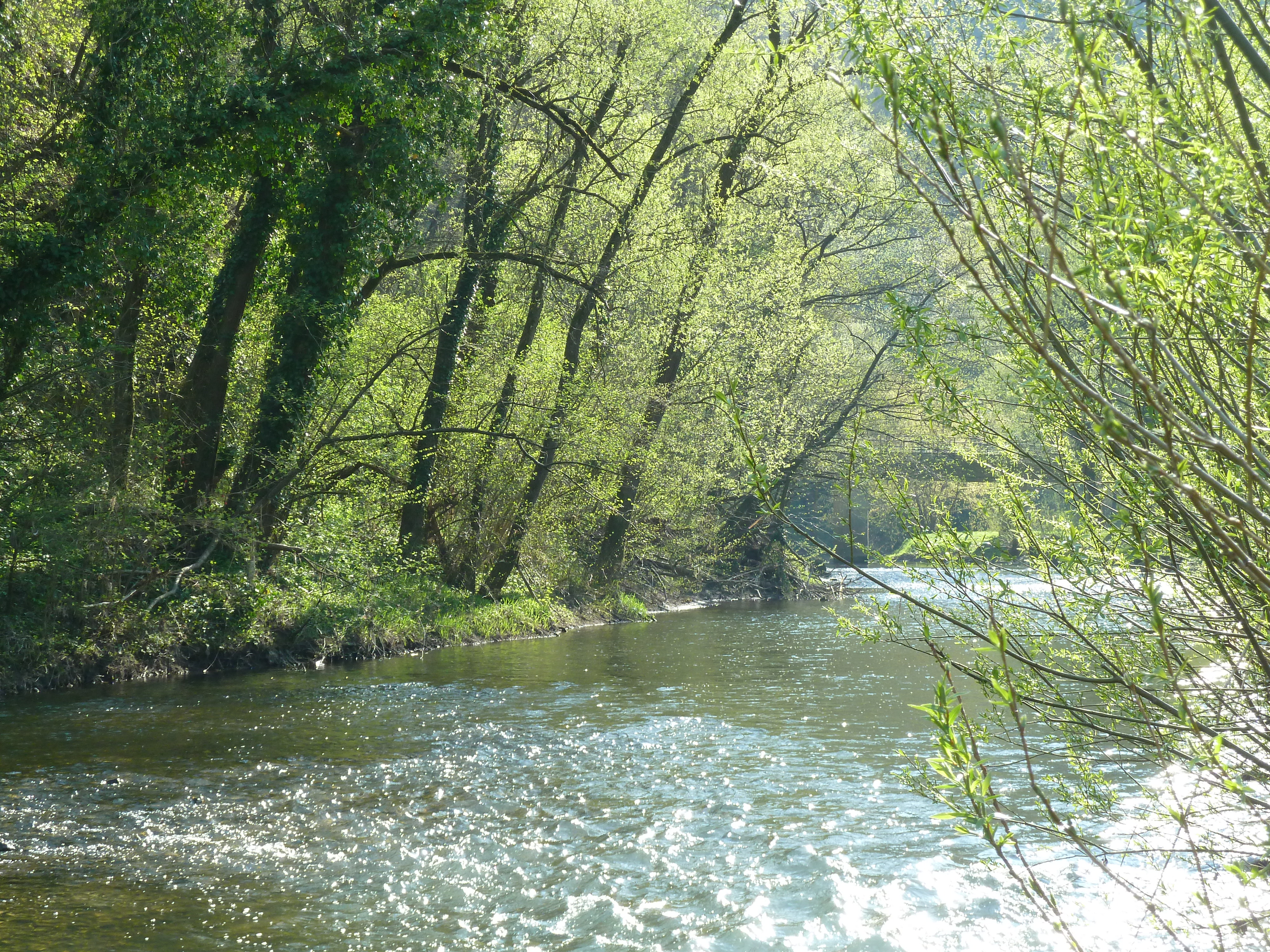
River Sutla/Sotla in the Zelenjak Gorge, near Kumrovec

Zagreb was not the only city in Croatia flooded by swollen rivers, though it bore the brunt of damages. About 221,900 ha (548,000 acres) of Croatia's territory, of which 158,000 ha (390,000 acres) was farmland, was flooded. Apart from Zagreb, affected areas included Istria, Zagorje, Podravina near Varaždin, and Međimurje. In Zagorje, the River Sutla (Slovene: Sotla), a left tributary of the Sava, washed out the railway in Kumrovec and stopped road traffic in Klanjec. Flooding in Kumrovec began on the night of 24–25 October. By 03:00, residents of a dozen houses in the village of Gmajna were stranded on the roofs of their homes. Major roads near Krapina and Pregrada were rendered impassable. Flooding on the right bank of the Drava upriver of Varaždin affected villages along the river, as well as the area around Matoš Square in the city. In Istria, material damage to agribusinesses in Umag and Labin was estimated at 3 billion Yugoslav dinars. The central and western Istria waterworks was knocked out, leaving 80,000 customers without tap water for at least three days. The Kupa overflowed near Karlovac, but had returned to normal flow on 28 October, as did the Sutla. In Sisak, the next city downriver from Zagreb, the village of Tišina Kaptolska was evacuated as the water began to rise on the night of 26–27 October. The city was saved by dynamiting the embankments upstream at Lijevi Dubrovčak, Martinska Ves and Zablatje. This caused the water to spill onto cornfields, and the water level at Sisak subsequently decreased by a metre (3.3 ft). By 28 October, all the bridges along the River Sava were closed, and the Jasenovac and Slavonski Kobaš pontoon bridges were pre-emptively dismantled because the river was carrying uprooted trees and large debris.

Flooding was also intense in Slovenia. Houses were flooded in Celje. Numerous roads were flooded in northeast Slovenia, including the road connecting Lendava, Slovenia, with Mursko Središče, Croatia, where a bridge over the Drava was destroyed by the torrent. In the southeast, in Krško, the waters caused damage to the Đuro Salaj paper factory. In the Nova Gorica District in the southwest, the worst damage occurred in Vipava, which was still under 30 cm (12 in) of water on 27 October.

== Preparations and impact ==
Though the extent of the flooded area in 1926 and 1933 may have been larger than in 1964, the expansion of the city in the meantime meant the impact on the city was much worse in 1964. Following the news of high water at Zidani Most, the city authorities held an emergency meeting at 08:00 (CET, 07:00 UTC) on 25 October. The embankments had been improved to hold against a flood of the scale of the 1933 event, but it immediately became obvious they would be topped. All emergency services together with the Yugoslav People's Army (JNA) were mobilised to help with flood defence efforts. By this point, the water level at the gauge at the bathhouse near the Sava Bridge, located at the border of Trešnjevka and Trnje, had already reached 288 cm (9 ft 5 in), nearly the height of the previous week's water wave crest.

The first radio warning of the flood was broadcast on Radio Zagreb on 25 October, as well as on television, and bells were rung in the city centre to alarm the citizens. Unfortunately, the riverside suburbs were too far from the centre to hear the bells, and many households did not own radio nor TV sets. The warnings also arrived fairly late; the first radio warning was only issued at 13:30, when parts of Podsused were already underwater. As most of the flooding happened at night and the warnings did not reach residents, many remained unaware of the danger until the water reached their houses. Many people who received the warnings were initially unwilling to leave their houses. During the floods of the 1920s and 1930s, almost none of the residents had dared leave their houses unattended for fear of looting. Many residents sent their children away with rescue services, planning to wait out the flood and take care of their possessions, only to find themselves trapped in attics and on the rooftops of their single-storey and two-storey homes as the water kept rising. For instance, in Folnegovićevo naselje, during the night of 26–27 October, the water reportedly rose by 2 m (6 ft 7 in) in three hours. In the later days of the flood, residents who successfully took shelter at the upper floors of taller buildings were also evacuated, as they were without access to tap water and sanitation. Newspapers noted that the sudden arrival of the flood created a confusion among many in the unaffected parts of the city who attempted to visit or commute to the flooded neighbourhoods, unaware of the disaster.

=== Damages and casualties ===
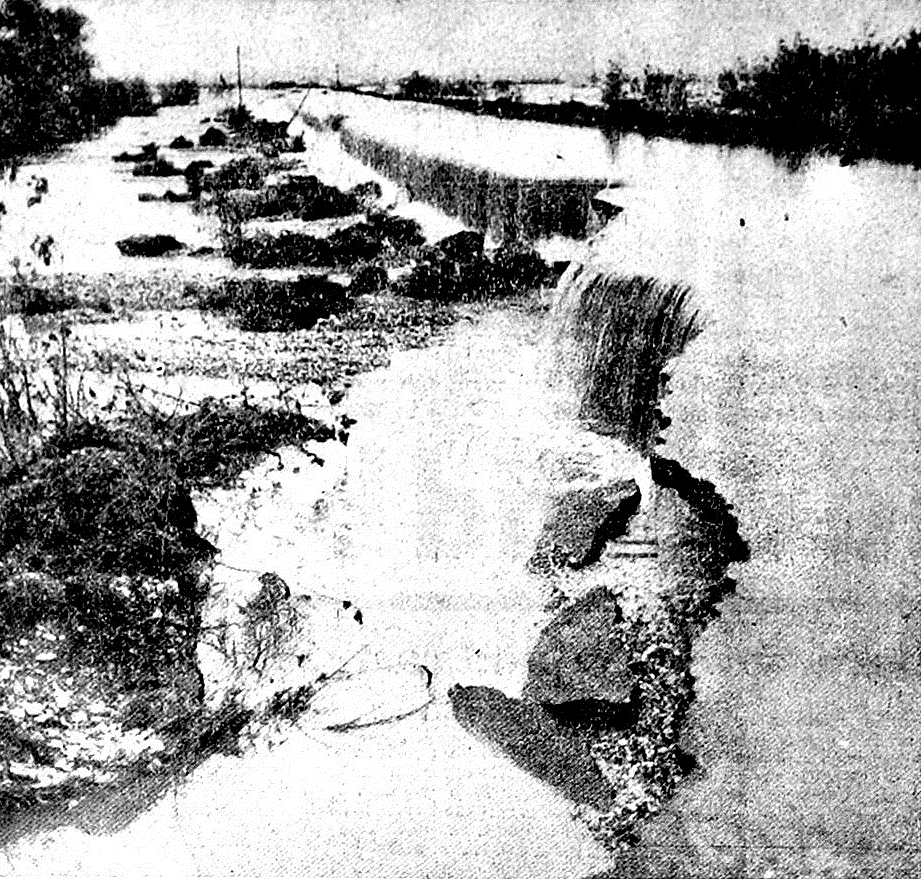
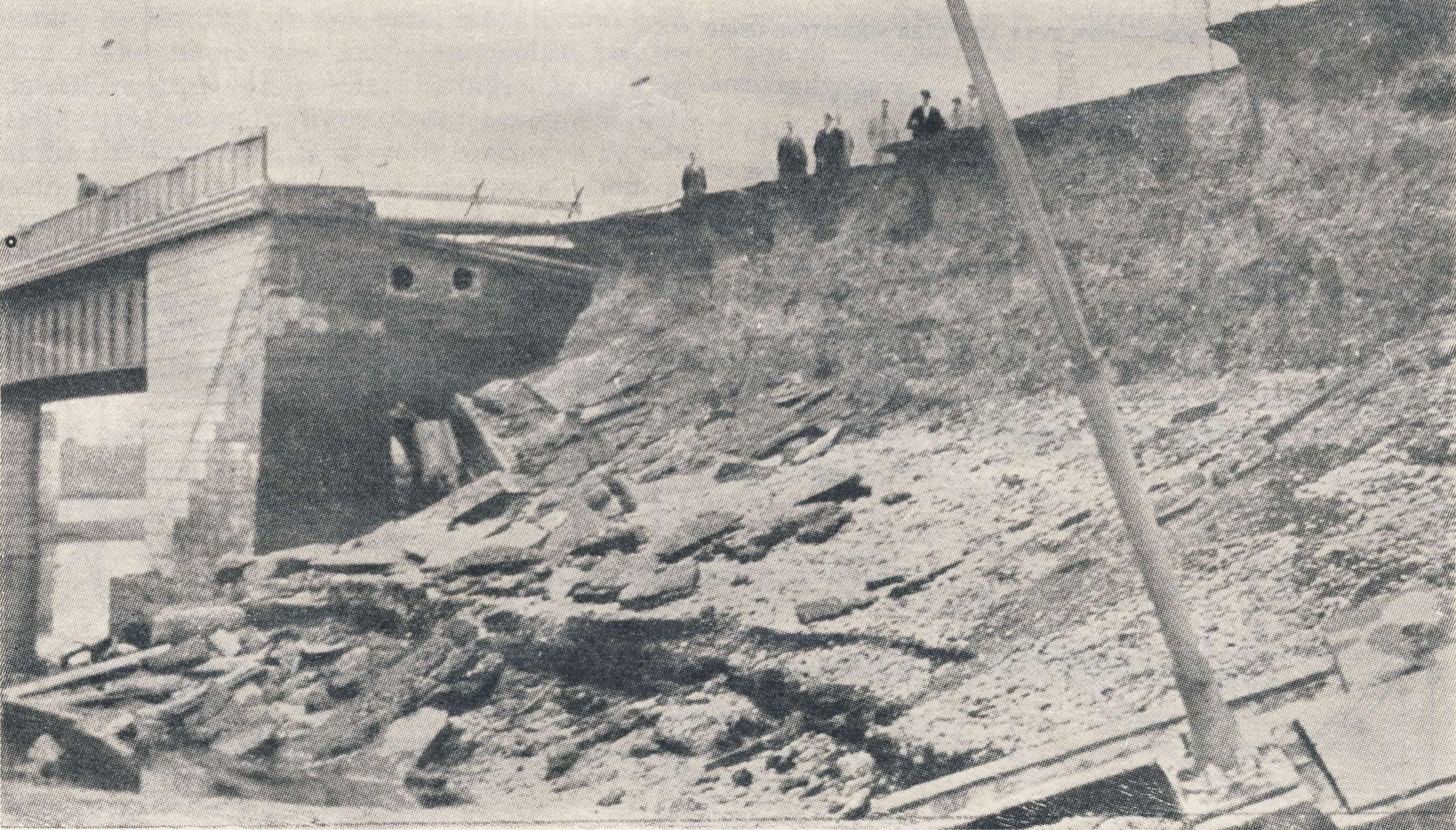
Parts of the highway to Ljubljana were washed out by the flood.

The first casualties were found and identified on 27 October, in Petruševec, Knežija and Staro Trnje. A total of 17 people died in the flood (14 according to some sources), while 65 were injured; not a large number considering the extent and severity of the flood. Out of half a million people living in Zagreb in 1964, 183,000 were living in the flooded area. The flood inundated 6,000 ha (15,000 acres; 60 km^{2}) of urban area and a third of the city's residential buildings, including 300 tower blocks. The maximum north–south span of the flooded area was 4 km (2.5 mi) in Trnje. The flood reached the railway embankment situated between Trnje and the city core. In Zagreb's surroundings, around 30,000 ha (74,000 acres) of farmland was underwater in the municipalities of Samobor, Zaprešić, Velika Gorica, Dugo Selo and Sesvete. 40,000 citizens lost their homes as 10,000 flats and single-family houses were condemned. Another 35,000 housing units were damaged but deemed fit for repairs. In Trešnjevka, 8,254 households, accounting for half the district's inhabitants, suffered property damage. Two kilometres (1.2 mi) of the Ljubljana–Zagreb–Belgrade Highway were washed out. The flood scoured the foundations of Jankomir and Jakuševec Bridges. The roadway of the latter was underwater during the flood.

While many employees aided by citizen volunteers tried to protect their workplaces, a total of 120 companies reported damage from the flood. 65 per cent of building material was lost, which complicated the rebuilding efforts. A total of 3,297 industrial property units were destroyed. The Jugomont construction company suffered 1 billion dinars in losses. Nearly all of its facilities were destroyed. In the Žitnjak industrial zone in Peščenica, the facilities of Auto-Hrvatska, Hidroelektra, Viadukt and Gramat were flooded. The Zagreb tram depot in Ljubljanica (Trešnjevka) was flooded soon after midnight on 25–26 October, but all tram cars were quickly evacuated and parked on higher ground on Mirogoj Road. Tram traffic remained in operation on the Črnomerec–Dubrava line along the dry northern rim of the river plain. Some factories endangered by the Sava and its tributaries outside Zagreb proper included Serum Zavod (today Pliva) in Kalinovica, Žumberak in Savski Marof, Jugomontaža in Brdovec, and Karbon and Jugokeramika in the Zaprešić area. In the Trešnjevka Square Nama, only six per cent of the inventory was saved from the flood. The Šimecki shoe shop sold wet shoes at a 95 per cent discount, finding a great demand. The initial estimate of damages was 100 billion dinars, not including personal property. This was later revised to 160 billion dinars, which was 9.18 per cent of SR Croatia's gross domestic product. Another estimate puts the damages at "more than US$100 million". For decades, the 1964 flood remained the costliest natural disaster in the history of the city.

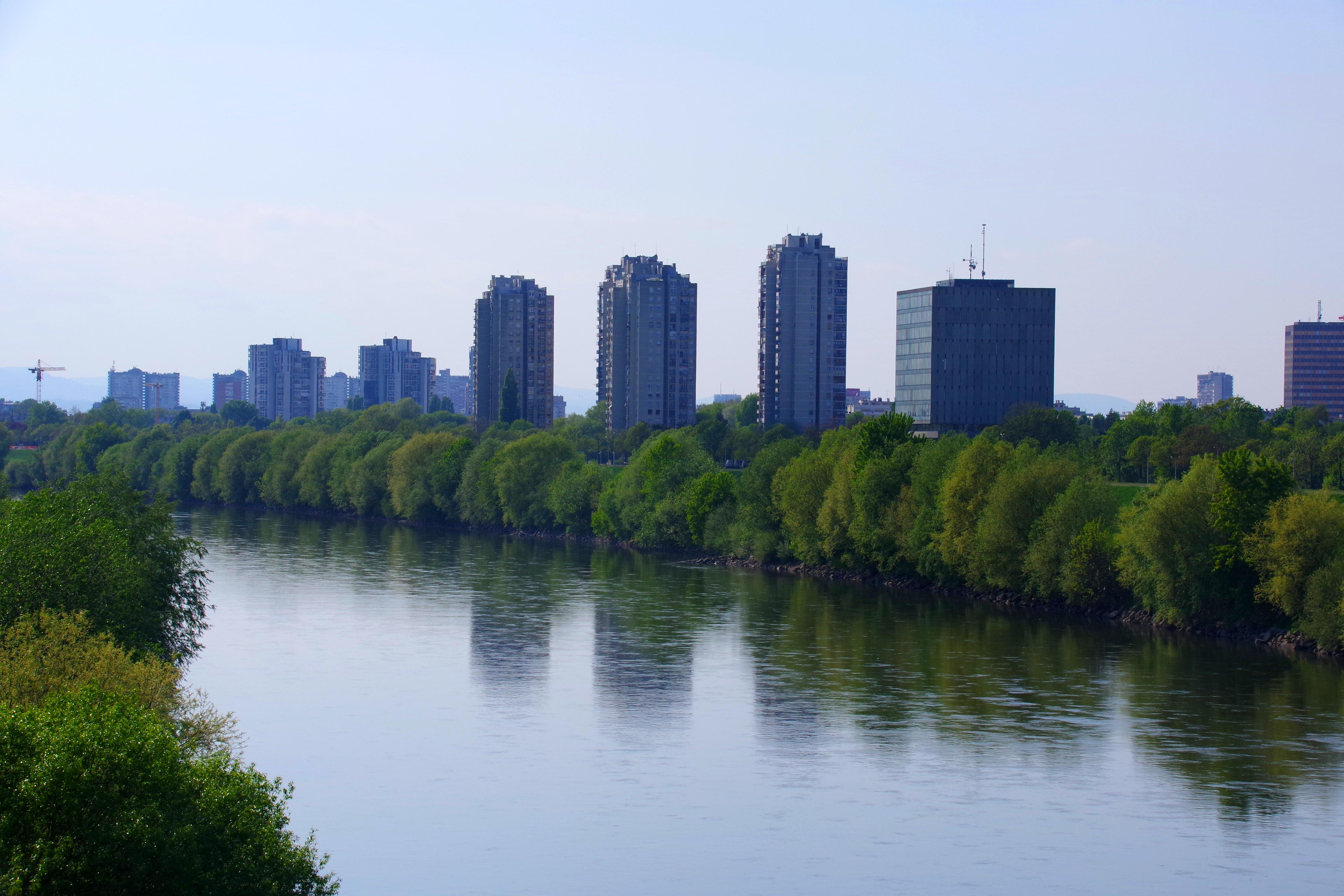
River Sava in Trnje. The reddish-brown Vjesnik Building can be partly seen at the right edge of the photo.

Zagreb's mass media were substantially affected by the flood. Zagreb's most widely read dailies, Vjesnik and Večernji list, and a number of weeklies, had their headquarters and print works in the Vjesnik Building, located in the low-lying Cvjetno naselje. Most of the machinery, paper, supplies, storage space and offices were in the basement and the first few floors of the building, as the higher floors were still under construction. Consequently, they were immediately under threat from the floodwaters which began entering the building at 03:00 on 26 October, and in several hours overcame impromptu defences and flooded most of the equipment, causing around 1 billion dinars in damages. Some parts of the building were in up to 4 m (13 ft) of water. This event left Zagreb without daily newspapers until Vjesnik and Večernji list managed to publish a limited-run joint two-page issue on 27 October, printed at the old print works in Donji grad. This joint arrangement between the two newspapers continued for a week. The Radio Television Zagreb, whose headquarters were close by, in Vrbik, faced a similar ordeal. As a consequence of these mishaps, there is some confusion as to the details of the events.

=== Rescue and relief efforts ===
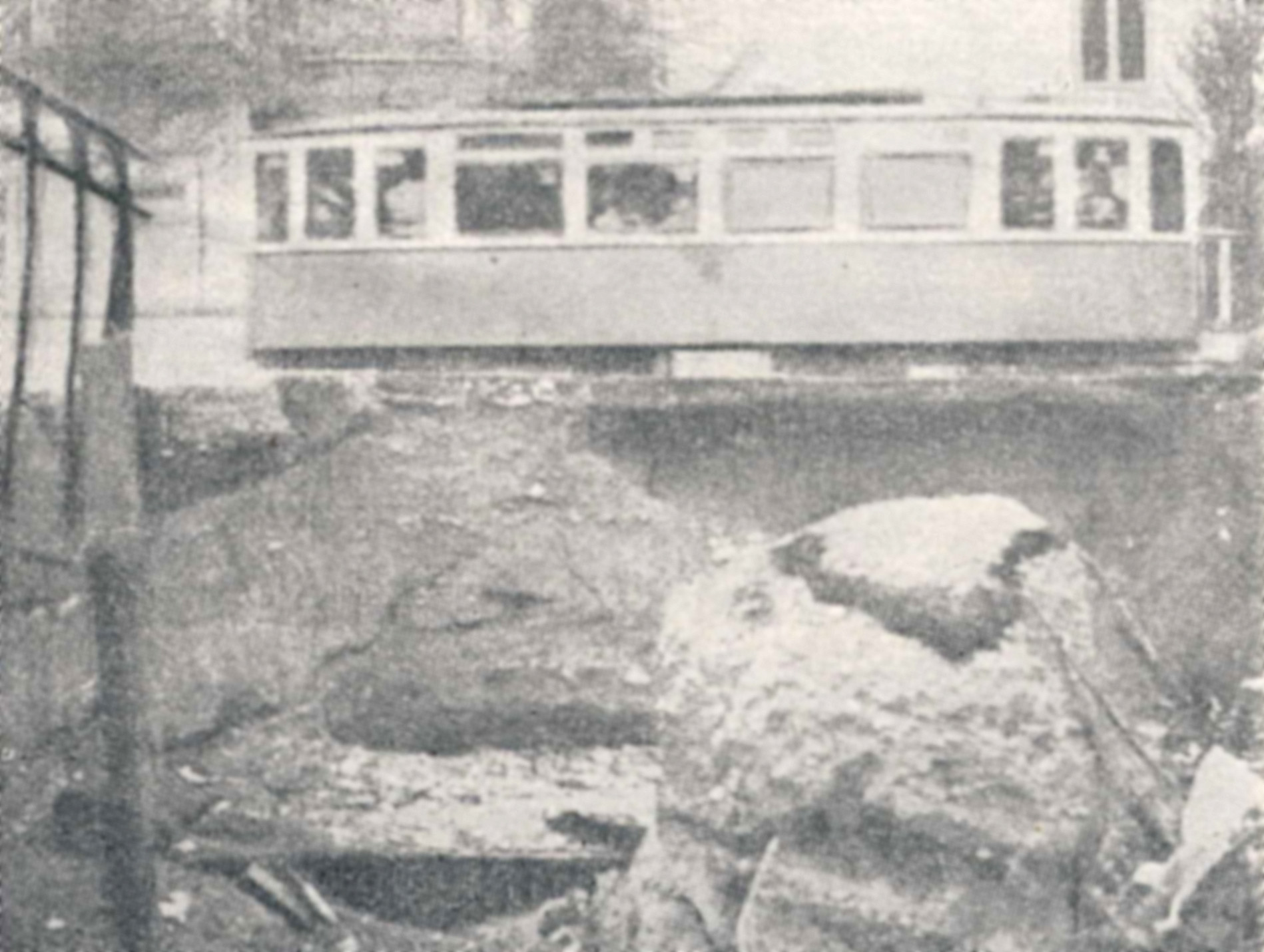
Tram passes alongside a scoured stretch of Savska Road

The rescue effort included 3,188 soldiers, who rescued around 3,000 trapped citizens. Lorry, tractor and bulldozer drivers were ordered to report to the city authorities to help with flood defence and rescues. In many factories, workers protected their workplaces round-the-clock, and in some cases they were aided by local residents. There were over 5,000 ambulance interventions between 25 and 29 October. In addition to 25 motor vehicles, ambulance crews often used boats to reach the patients. Light injuries were treated at the Red Cross building in Donji grad. Injured and sick children were transferred to the Bistra Hospital in Zagorje. Over 10,000 people took part in maintaining flood defences, evacuating neighbourhoods, caring for the flood refugees at the shelters, treating injuries, and other mitigation efforts. The rescue efforts were hampered by the fact that there was no electricity in the flooded area, and rescue crews had to rely on torches. The proceeds of the NK Zagreb – A.S. Roma association football match held on 28 October for the 1964–65 Inter-Cities Fairs Cup were donated toward recovery from the flood. The game was held at the Maksimir Stadium. NK Zagreb's home ground, Stadion Kranjčevićeva, was in flooded Trešnjevka.

Numerous cities in Croatia and Yugoslavia, as well as foreign countries, offered help with relief efforts. The United States, Italy, West Germany, and Austria offered medical supplies and equipment. Belgrade, Bjelovar, Karlovac, Kragujevac, Rijeka, Split, and Virovitica offered assistance with relief efforts. Belgrade sent tankers for street cleaning, and electric generators. Bjelovar, Karlovac, Varaždin, Donja Stubica, and Jastrebarsko sent generator-powered water pumps. The SR Croatia Red Cross set up camp beds in Zagreb hospitals, and distributed clothing, blankets and some food supplies to the evacuees. Food supplies were donated by various companies, including Sljeme, Mosor and Lovački Rog. Firewood was brought in from other cities and Yugoslav republics, as Zagreb's firewood stores were flooded.

A chlorination campaign was carried out due to the contamination of the city's water supply. In addition, the hygiene crisis prompted an organised mass vaccination of Zagrebers for typhoid and paratyphoid fever. Karlovac, Novo Mesto, Opatija, Ljubljana and Kranj sent tankers with clean water.

== Aftermath ==
=== Effects on the city ===
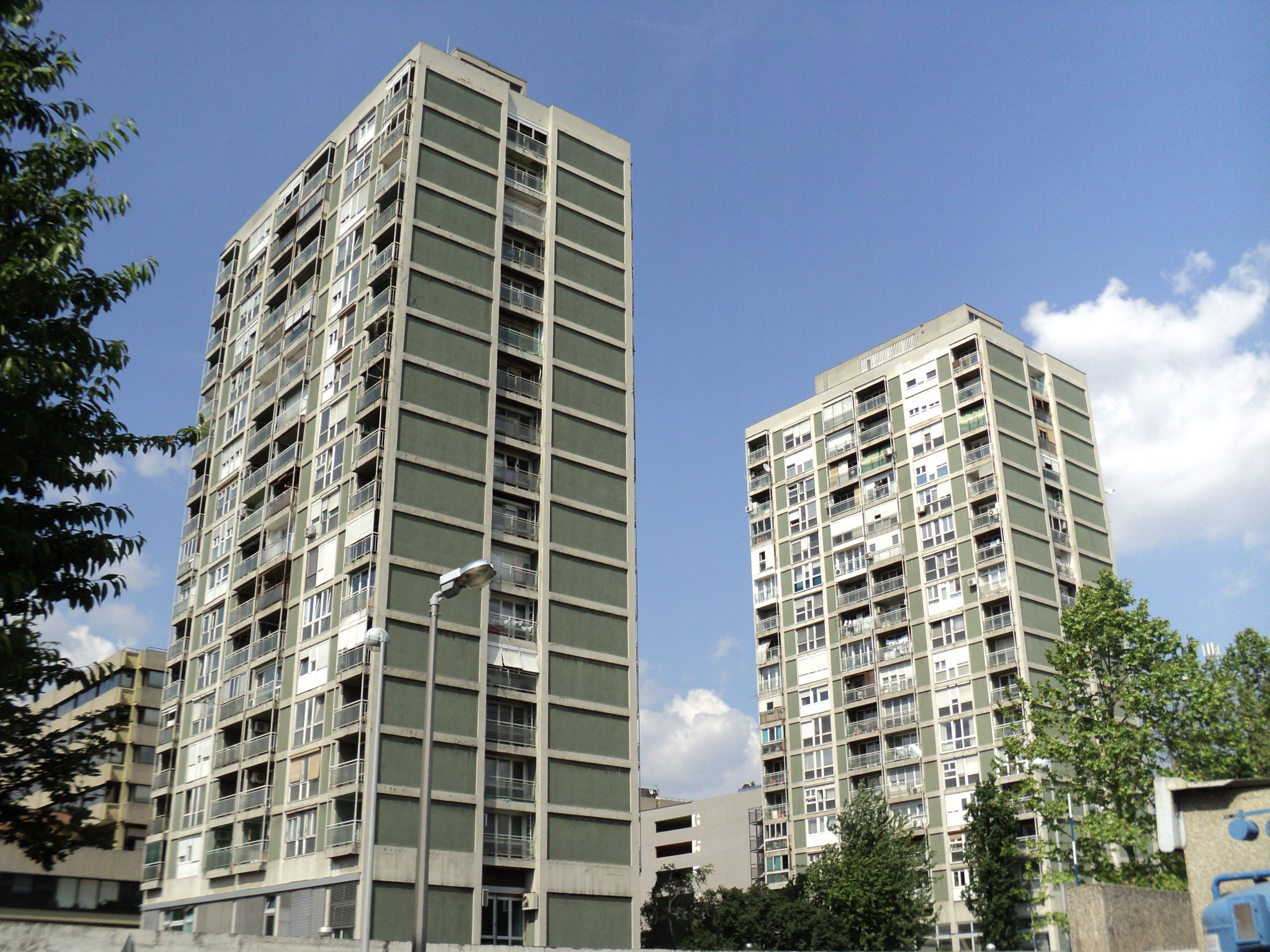
1960s skyscrapers in Vrbik. Large apartment buildings gained foothold in neighbourhoods previously dominated by single-storey homes.

A few houses were reportedly carried away by the water current in Jarun. Most flooded buildings remained standing but many of these were rendered uninhabitable by effects of the flood and subsequently condemned. Some of the yellow crosses signifying buildings tagged for repair survive to the present day. Many buildings which were found fit for repairs were temporarily uninhabitable, as their waterlogged walls and floors made it impossible to dry and heat them for the incoming winter. For instance, the building of the University of Zagreb's Faculty of Humanities and Social Sciences, constructed in 1962 and located in Vrbik, was flooded up to 1.6 m (5 ft 3 in) deep, and following the flood, the basement and ground floor remained unusable for over a year, some of the classrooms could not be heated, and the walls had to be replastered due to the damp. Around 13,000 students were unable to attend classes because of damage to schools and the University of Zagreb. Costly damages were incurred in university laboratories, libraries and telephone exchanges, which tended to be located on the ground floor or in the basement. Citizens whose homes were flooded were evacuated to student dormitories and school classrooms.

The consequences of the flood changed the cityscape of southern Zagreb. The worst damage occurred in Trnje. The neighbourhood of Vrbik was almost completely destroyed: 90 per cent of its housing units was condemned. The recovery efforts, organised by Mayor Pero Pirker, led to the creation of a number of new neighbourhoods to replace and compensate for lost housing. As a first recourse for those made homeless by the flood, the city government passed a motion to begin construction of 1,000 flats with another 9,000 slated for construction in 1965. Estates of prefabricated small single-family houses and single-storey apartment houses were erected in many suburban locations, including Botinec, Retkovec, Prilesje, Maksimirsko naselje, Gajnice and others. These neighbourhoods were meant to be temporary until the residents could be assigned a free replacement flat; however, due to a housing shortage, many residents ended up living in the temporary buildings into the 21st century.

In total, around 26,000 new housing units and 34 schools were built during the next three years. In the next decade, the neighbourhoods of Knežija, Kalinovica and Srednjaci in the Jarun area, which had been mostly occupied by single-storey and two-storey houses, were turned into high-rise housing estates, home to 29,300 people by the early 1970s. On the whole, 6,731 new housing units were built in Trešnjevka between the Ljubljana–Zagreb Highway and the river. The worst hit part of Kruge similarly evolved into the modern-day high-rise Trnjanska Savica neighbourhood, and further high-rise estates were constructed in Novi Zagreb. Despite the flood, Zagreb's population increased by a third during the decade of 1961–1971. In the latter half of the 1960s a number of factories were moved from the inner city to the outskirts, outside the flood zone. The Kraš factory was moved to its present-day location in Ravnice. The Gredelj railway workshop facilities in Trnje, next to Zagreb Main Railway Station, were gradually closed as a new plant was opened in 1968 in Peščenica.

=== Improvements to flood defences ===
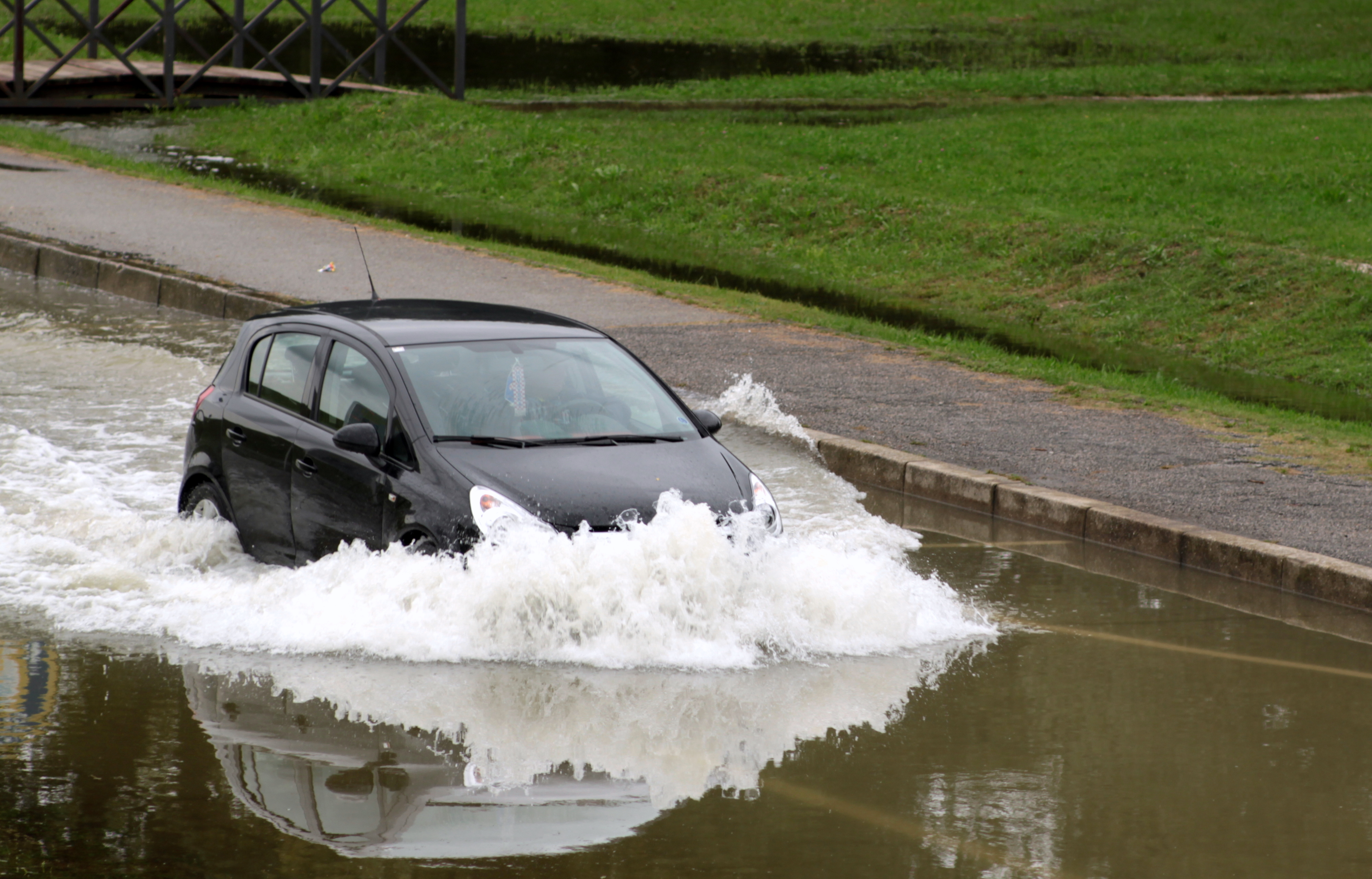
Groundwater floods Lake Jarun quay, close to the Sava's left embankment, September 2010. The 2010 Slovenia floods heavily affected areas upriver and downriver, but Zagreb suffered minimal damage.

The government quickly set out to improve Zagreb's flood defences. On 28 October, the authorities began making repairs to the embankments. More flooding was feared, because the wave action of the receding waters deepened the breaches. Several months after the flood, an overhaul of embankments was started with youth work actions. The embankments, whose tops had been 1.5–2 m (5–7 ft) above the floodplain, were reconstructed and elevated to a height of 4–6 m (13–20 ft) on the 27 km (17 mi) stretch from Podsused to Ivanja Reka. On this stretch, the embankments were built 300 m (980 ft) apart; the river was placed in a roughly 100 m (330 ft) wide channel flanked by detention fields of a similar width. The regulation works significantly altered the terrain near the parts of the river which had not been covered by the old embankments. Among other changes, this included draining the marshes and lakes in the village of Jakuševec and separating Lake Jarun from the Sava. During the flood, the city's landfills were under water, so the refuse was dumped at a temporary site in Dubrava. During the river regulation works, a new landfill was built in 1965 in Jakuševec.

The floods prompted work on flood defences on the entire course of the Sava, including diversion canals protecting Zagreb, Sisak and Karlovac. Construction of the Sava–Odra–Sava Canal in Zagreb started in 1965, and ended in the early 1970s. Branching from the Sava's right bank upriver of the inner city, at Jankomir, the canal extends 32 km (20 mi) in the southeast direction, connecting the river with the River Odra and the Odra Field, a natural detention basin which can accommodate up to 1,809,000,000 m^{3} (1,467,000 acre⋅ft) of water. The canal has a capacity of more than 1,500 m^{3}/s (53,000 cu ft/s). The 1,000 m (3,300 ft) wide Jankomir weir is opened by dynamiting the lip of the embankment. It is designed to accept water into the canal when the water level at the Sava Bridge gauge exceeds 350 cm (11 ft 6 in), which corresponds to a flow of 1,900 m^{3}/s (67,000 cu ft/s). This acts to reduce the amount of water entering the urban area during high water events, and decrease the risk of the floodwater rising past the crown of Zagreb's embankments.

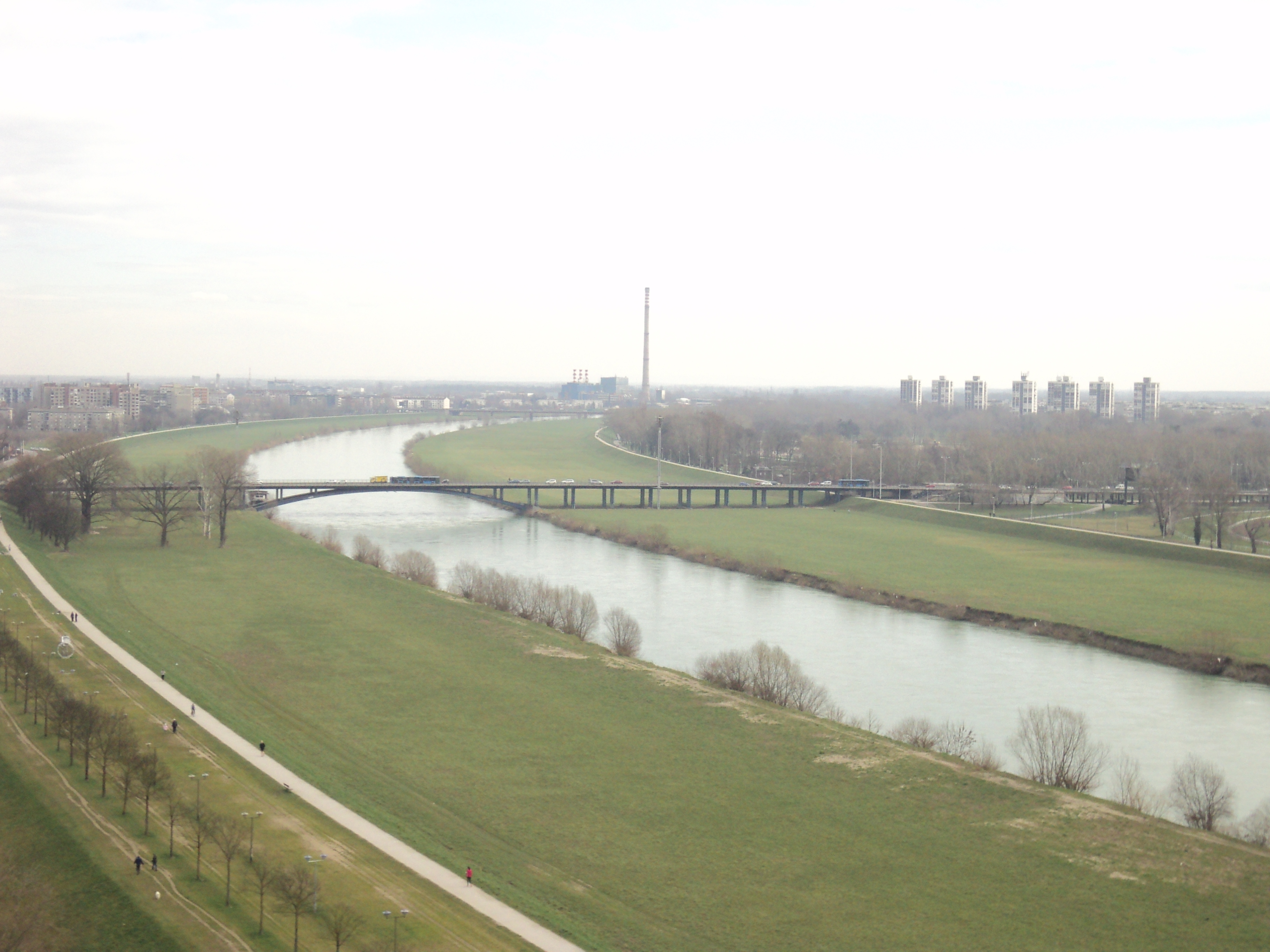
The River Sava at the Liberty Bridge. At low to moderate flow levels, the Sava stays in its channel (as pictured), while at high flow it expands into the detention fields up to the embankments.

According to Hrvatske vode, in the Zagreb urban area between Podsused and Mičevec Bridges, the embankments exceed the crest of a 1,000-year flood by a metre (3.3 ft). However, surrounding towns and villages are protected by lower and less secure embankments. As such, low-lying parts of the surrounding area remain in danger from flooding. The flood of 1964 was the last devastating river flood in Zagreb. Some of the later Sava Valley floods, such as the ones in 1979 and 2014 have produced localised groundwater flooding in a few streets in Kajzerica and Jarun. The 1990 Sava Valley flood broke the 1933 high water mark in Radeče by another 54 cm (21 in) and caused much damage in Zagreb's surroundings, especially the area of Samobor and Zaprešić, but the city proper was spared, except for the (by then already decommissioned) Jakuševec Bridge, which was carried away by the river current. The levels of flooding of 1964 and before have not recurred as of 2021.

Progress on the Sava–Odra–Sava Canal stopped in the 1970s. It was initially intended to extend along the Odra's course all the way to the Sava, but today ends in the Odra Field. This increases the flood risk in the Odra Valley; during the 1990 Sava Valley flood, high inflow into the canal caused the Odra to flood the village of Čička Poljana. Near Samobor and Zaprešić, the river in parts completely lacks embankments. According to academic Stjepan Šterc, cutting off the detention basins in this area without completing the Sava–Odra–Sava Canal would increase the risk of flooding in Zagreb.

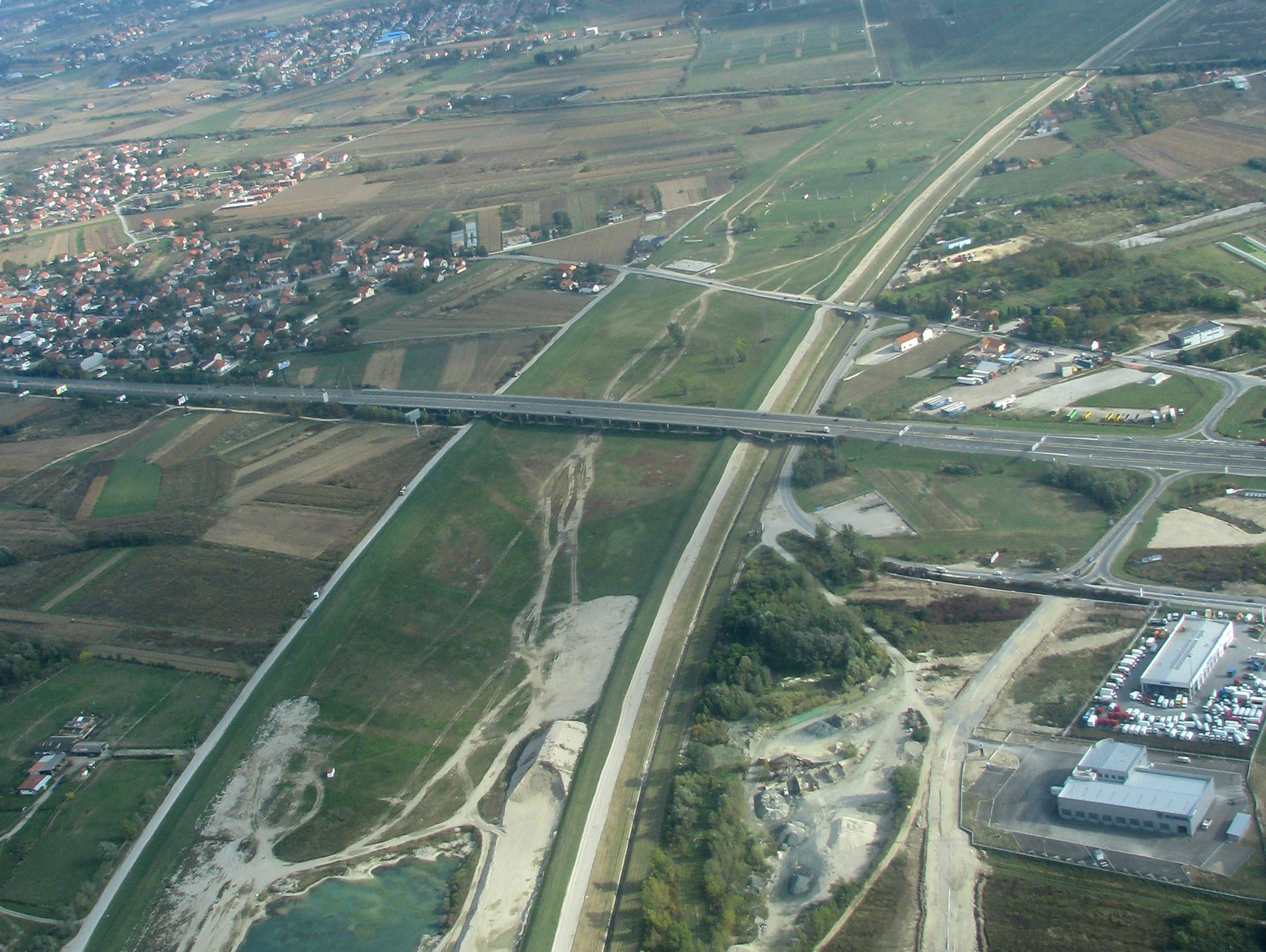
The Sava–Odra–Sava Canal is dry most of the year. It is opened when the Sava reaches flood stage.

The water flow necessary to activate the canal has increased over the years due to the incision of the Sava's riverbed in Zagreb by more than 3 m (9.8 ft). Already in 1979, a level of 382 cm (150 in) at the Zagreb gauge was not enough to cause water to flow over the Jankomir weir. The issue of river profile changes due to sediment transport was intended to be solved by a series of hydroelectric dams between Podsused and Rugvica, but these plans were not carried out. The incision trend stopped and began to reverse in 1994 following the construction of a weir near the Zagreb Thermoelectric Heat Plant in Peščenica. Despite the riverbed changes and the diversion canal, a 2011 study found no statistically significant changes in yearly water level maximums. This was partly attributed to a detrimental effect due to the new dams and flood defence work conducted upriver in Slovenia. In addition, due to river incision, the Jankomir weir was as of 2008 functional only at flows exceeding 2,350 m^{3}/s (83,000 cu ft/s). As of 2015, the canal has been opened nine times.

=== Legacy ===
The 1964 flood is remembered as the worst flood and one of worst natural disasters to strike Zagreb, but also as the last major flood, after which the city dealt with the danger posed by the Sava.

Filmmaker Bogdan Žižić made his directorial debut with Poplava (The Flood), a 1964 short documentary film created out of television footage of the events. The flood and recovery became the defining event of Pero Pirker's mayoralty. Out of all Zagreb mayors, he is perceived as the most affected by the flooding of Sava, although mayors before him also suffered calamitous floods. The recovery of the city from the catastrophe made Pirker a highly popular mayor, and he continued his career at the national level, but fell into oblivion following the suppression of the Croatian Spring in 1971 and his death from cancer the next year.

== See also ==
- List of floods in Europe
- 1880 Zagreb earthquake
- 2020 Zagreb earthquake

== Bibliography ==
- "Joint flood edition, 27 October 1964" (PDF). Vjesnik/Večernji list (in Croatian): 1–2.
- "Joint flood edition, 28 October 1964" (PDF). Vjesnik/Večernji list (in Croatian): 1–10.
- "Provedbeni plan obrane od poplava branjenog područja 14: središnji dio područja maloga sliva Zagrebačko Prisavlje na Sektoru C – Gornja Sava" [Flood defence implementation plan for Defence Area 14: the central part of the Zagrebačko Prisavlje small catchment area on Sector C – Upper Sava] (PDF) (in Croatian). Hrvatske vode. March 2014. Archived from the original (PDF) on 14 May 2021.
- Bencetić, Lidija (1 August 2020). "Indicators of the housing stock in Zagreb from 1945 until the late 1960s". Review of Croatian History. XVI (1). Zagreb: 77–91. doi:10.22586/review.v16i1.11292. ISSN 1845-4380. S2CID 225398656.
- Bonacci, Ognjen; Ljubenkov, Igor (15 April 2008). "Changes in flow conveyance and implication for flood protection, Sava River, Zagreb". Hydrological Processes. 22 (8): 1189–1196. Bibcode:2008HyPr...22.1189B. doi:10.1002/hyp.6688. S2CID 128715368.
- Bonacci, Ognjen; Oskoruš, Dijana (2011). "Hidrološka analiza sigurnosti Zagreba od poplave vodama rijeke Save u novim uvjetima" [Hydrological analysis of the City of Zagreb's safety from floods by the Sava waters under new conditions] (PDF). Hrvatske Vode (in Croatian). 19 (75): 13–24. Archived from the original (PDF) on 16 November 2021.
- Čapo, Hrvoje (31 March 2020). "Odnos zagrebačke gradske vlasti prema južnoj periferiji između dva svjetska rata" [City of Zagreb authorities' treatment of the southern outskirts during the Interbellum]. Časopis za suvremenu povijest (in Croatian). 52 (1): 53–78. doi:10.22586/csp.v52i1.9886. ISSN 0590-9597. S2CID 216300966.
- Goldstein, Ivo; Goldstein, Slavko, eds. (2012). Povijest grada Zagreba 1: Od prethistorije do 1918. [History of the City of Zagreb 1: From Prehistory to 1918] (in Croatian). Zagreb: Novi Liber. ISBN 9789533250205.
- Hutinec, Goran; Goldstein, Ivo (2013). Goldstein, Slavko (ed.). Povijest grada Zagreba 2: 20. i 21. stoljeće [History of the City of Zagreb 2: 20th and 21st Century] (in Croatian). Zagreb: Novi Liber. ISBN 9789533250212.
- Karbić, Marija; Škreblin, Bruno (2015). "Grad na rijeci ili pored nje: srednjovjekovni Zagreb i rijeka Sava" [The Town On or Close to the River: Medieval Zagreb and the Sava River]. In Ostajmer, Branko (ed.). Rijeka Sava u povijesti. Zbornik radova znanstvenog skupa održanog u Slavonskom Brodu 18-19. listopada 2013. [River Sava Through History. A Collection of Works of the 18–19 October 2013 Conference in Slavonski Brod] (in Croatian). Slavonski Brod: Croatian Institute of History. pp. 163–179. ISBN 978-953-6659-88-3.
- Kolar-Dimitrijević, Mira (15 December 1983). "Socijalno-ekonomska politika gradske općine Zagreba s obzirom na položaj radničkog stanovništva od velike svjetske krize do početka drugoga svjetskog rata (1931–1939)" [Socioeconomic politics of the Zagreb city government with respect to the condition of the working class from the Great Depression to the beginning of World War II (1931–1939)]. Povijesni Prilozi (in Croatian). 2 (2): 171–244. ISSN 0351-9767.
- Kolar-Dimitrijević, Mira (2010). "Socijalni slojevi i uvjeti života u južnom dijelu Zagreba u međuratnom razdoblju (1918.-1941.)" [Social strata and living conditions in the southern part of Zagreb between the two world wars (1918–1941)] (PDF). Hrvatske Vode (in Croatian). 18 (73): 221–230.
- Kuzmić, Zdenko (2013). Poplava u Zagrebu 1964. godine [1964 Zagreb Flood] (in Croatian). Zagreb City Museum. ISBN 978-953-6942-13-8.
- Marušić, Josip (2019). "Stručni prikaz: 55 godina od katastrofalne poplave Zagreba krajem listopada 1964" [Expert review: 55 years since the catastrophic Zagreb flood of October 1964]. Hrvatske Vode (in Croatian). 27 (110): 347–354. ISSN 1330-1144.
- Richter, Melita (31 December 1975). "Sociological Analysis of Knežija, Kalinovica and Srednjaci Colonies". Revija za sociologiju (in Croatian). 5 (4): 67–73. ISSN 0350-154X.
- Riđanović, Josip (1964). "Katastrofalna poplava Zagreba u listopadu 1964." [Catastrophic Zagreb flood in October 1964]. Hrvatski geografski glasnik (in Croatian). 26 (1): 294. ISSN 1331-5854.
- Riđanović, Josip; Tusić, Vesna; Tropan, Ljudevit (1 September 1991). "Flood in the Zagreb–Karlovac–Sisak region, November 1990". Acta Geographica Croatica (in Croatian). 26 (1). University of Zagreb: 1–15. ISSN 1330-0466.
- Roksandić, Drago; Branđolica, Tomislav; Lovrić, Marko; Sarić, Nikolina; Šimetin Šegvić, Filip (2010). "Filozofski fakultet u poplavi 1964. godine: sjećanja i dokumenti" [The Faculty of Philosophy in the 1964 Zagreb flood: recollections and documents] (PDF). Hrvatske Vode (in Croatian). 18 (73): 241–248. Archived from the original (PDF) on 16 November 2021.
- Senjković, Reana (2017). "Uvod" [Introduction] (PDF). Omladinske radne akcije – dizajn ideologije [Youth work actions – the design of an ideology] (in Croatian). Zagreb: Kulturno informativni centar. pp. 5–14. ISBN 978-953-57150-4-7.
- Slukan Altić, Mirela (2010). "The history of the Sava river regulation at Zagreb and its consequences on the city's development" (PDF). Hrvatske Vode (in Croatian). 18 (73): 205–212. Archived from the original (PDF) on 16 November 2021.
- Šterc, Stjepan (22 June 1979). "Zagreb flood defences by the Sava – Odra – Sava canal". Hrvatski geografski glasnik (in Croatian). 41–42 (1): 97–115. ISSN 1331-5854.
- Štulhofer, Ariana; Barišić Marenić, Zrinka; Uchytil, Andrej (2010). "Kupališta i drugi sportsko-rekreacijski sadržaji uz rijeku Savu u Zagrebu" [Beaches and other sporting and recreational spots along the Sava in Zagreb] (PDF). Hrvatske Vode (in Croatian). 18 (73): 231–240. Archived from the original (PDF) on 16 November 2021.
- Trninić, Dušan; Bošnjak, Tomislava (2009). "Karakteristični protoci Save kod Zagreba" [Characteristic discharge of the Sava in Zagreb] (PDF). Hrvatske Vode (in Croatian). 17 (69/70): 257–268. Archived from the original (PDF) on 16 November 2021.
- Vadlja, Josip (January 1965). "Poplava u Zagrebu 1964". Građevinar (in Croatian). XVII (1). Zagreb: 26–31.
- Vujasinović, Branko (2015). "Podsjećanje na velike vode u prošlosti" [A look back at historical floods] (PDF). Hrvatske Vode (in Croatian). 23 (91): 29–34. Archived from the original (PDF) on 26 August 2021.
