= Odra (Kupa) =

River in central Croatia

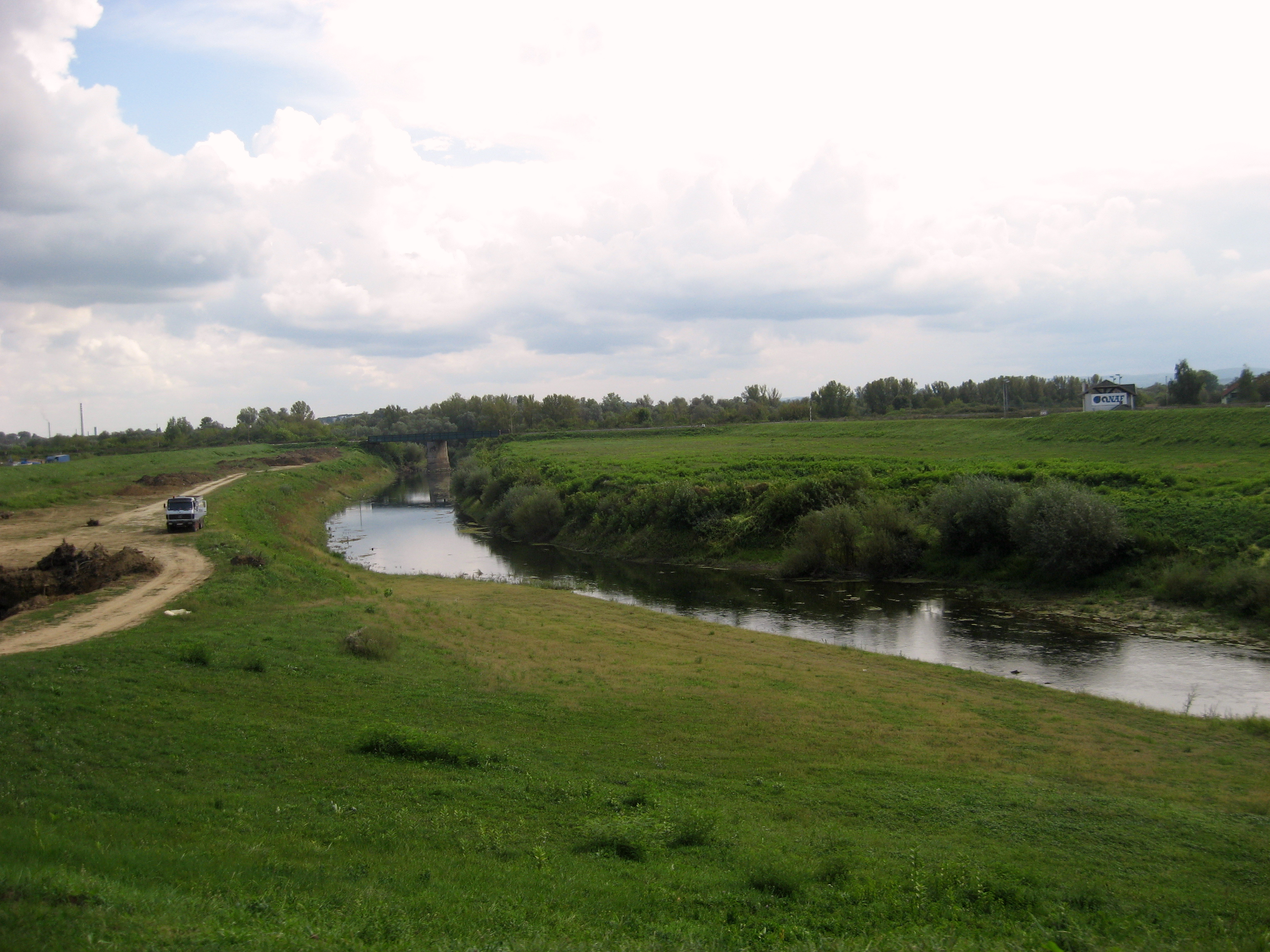
- Odra near Sisak

Location
- Country: Croatia

Physical characteristics
- Mouth
  - location: Kupa
  - coordinates: 45.4943°N 16.3546°E
- Length: 83 km (52 mi)
- Basin size: 604 km^{2} (233 sq mi)

Basin features
- Progression: Kupa→ Sava→ Danube→ Black Sea

Odra (pronounced [odra]) is a river in central Croatia. It is 83 km (52 mi) long and its basin covers an area of 604 km^{2} (233 mi^{2}). Its source is in the Žumberak mountain, southwest of Zagreb. It flows eastwards, passes south of Velika Gorica, then turns south-east, more or less parallel to the river Sava. It flows into the river Kupa near Odra Sisačka, just northeast of Sisak, also just before the Kupa joins the river Sava.

The upper flow of Odra has been significantly altered by humans, by the digging of the 32 km (20 mi) long canal Sava-Odra(-Sava) south of Zagreb, as a measure against flooding (designed taking into account the maximum flows of 1964, 1973 and 1974, and first put to use in 1979).

There is no certain etymology for the river's name, it could be Slavic or pre-Slavic, and 20th-century linguists did not have a consensus about it.
