= Chromos Tower =

Coordinates: 45°48′10″N 16°0′33″E

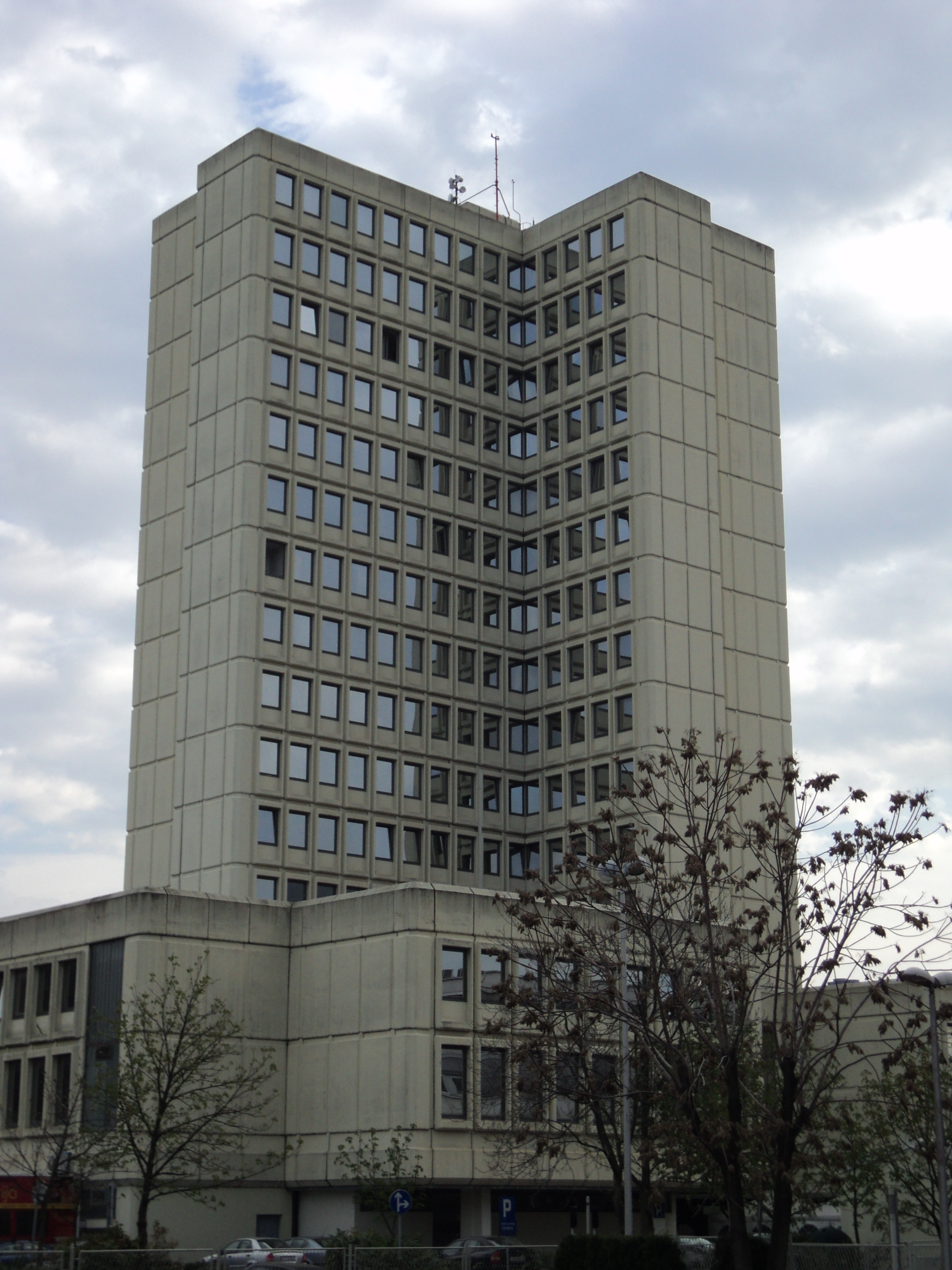
- Chromos Tower
- Interactive map of the Chromos Tower area

General information
- Status: Completed
- Type: Office
- Location: Zagreb, Croatia
- Opening: 1989

Height
- Roof: 60 m (200 ft)

Technical details
- Floor count: 15

Design and construction
- Architects: Marijan Turkulin, Peter Vouk

Chromos Tower is a 60-meter (200 ft) office tower in Zagreb, Croatia. The tower was constructed in 1989 and was originally the main headquarters of the Chromos Corporation after which it was named. It is located in Kanal neighborhood, on the corner of the Vukovar Street and Vjekoslav Heinzel street. It is the last high-rise building built in Zagreb before the Croatian War of Independence (1991–1995).

== Basic characteristics ==
The building has 15 floors and a total height of 60 meters. It was originally intended as the headquarters of the Company Chromos, hence the name. Today, it is used as office space by about 40 companies, and about 600 employees come to work here every day.

== See also ==
Media related to Chromos Tower at Wikimedia Commons

- List of tallest buildings in Croatia
