= Cvjetno naselje, Zagreb =

Neighbourhood in Zagreb, Croatia

Cvjetno naselje
- Neighbourhood
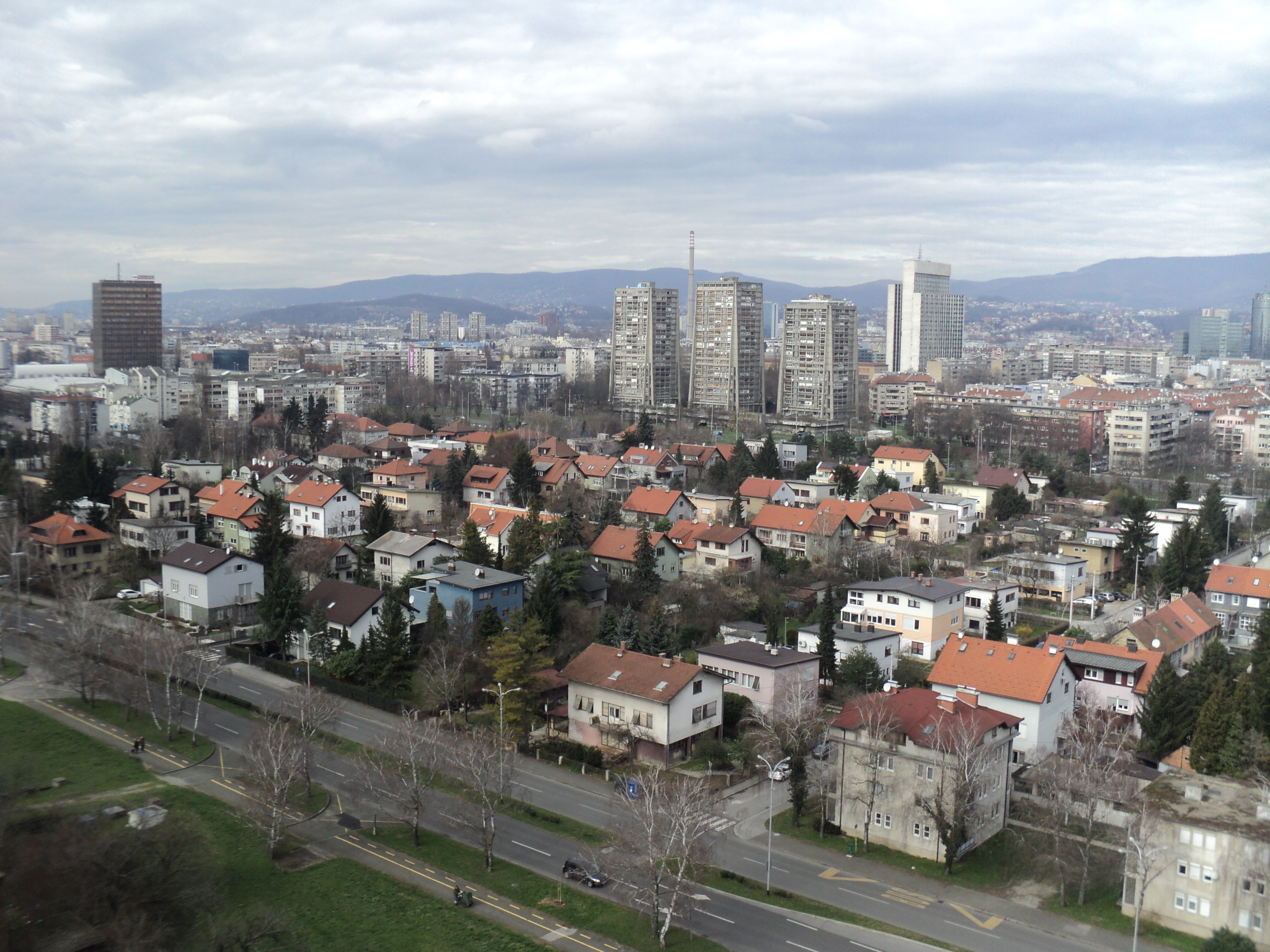
- Aerial view
- Interactive map of Cvjetno naselje
- Country: Croatia
- City: Zagreb
- District: Trnje

Population (2021)
  - Total: 1,625

Cvjetno naselje (lit. 'flower place') is a neighbourhood in the southwest of Zagreb, Croatia, within the Trnje district. The area of the local city council of Cvjetno naselje has a population of 1,625 (census 2021).

The area was the first planned construction in Trnje, started in 1939 as a project of the architect Vlado Antolić. It replaced the old city garden.
