= Trnje, Zagreb =

Coordinates: 45°47′41.29″N 15°58′45.14″E

Trnje
- Interactive map of Trnje

Government
  - Council president: Ivan Bare

Area
  - Total: 7.37 km^{2} (2.85 sq mi)

Population
  - Total: 45,267
  - Density: 6,140/km^{2} (15,900/sq mi)

Trnje (Croatian pronunciation: [tr̩̂ːɲe]) is an area of Zagreb, Croatia. According to the 2011 census, it had 42,282 residents. It is located in the central part of the city, south of Donji grad across the railway (Zagreb Main Station), east of Trešnjevka (Savska road), west of Peščenica (Vjekoslav Heinzel Avenue and Marin Držić Avenue), and north of the river Sava. The Slavonska Avenue intersects Trnje.

Trnje was amalgamated into the city in 1927 by Mayor Vjekoslav Heinzel, along with several other new districts, mainly for the purpose of housing people needed for Zagreb's industrial sector expansion.

As a district, Trnje has an elected council.

== Neighborhoods and local councils ==
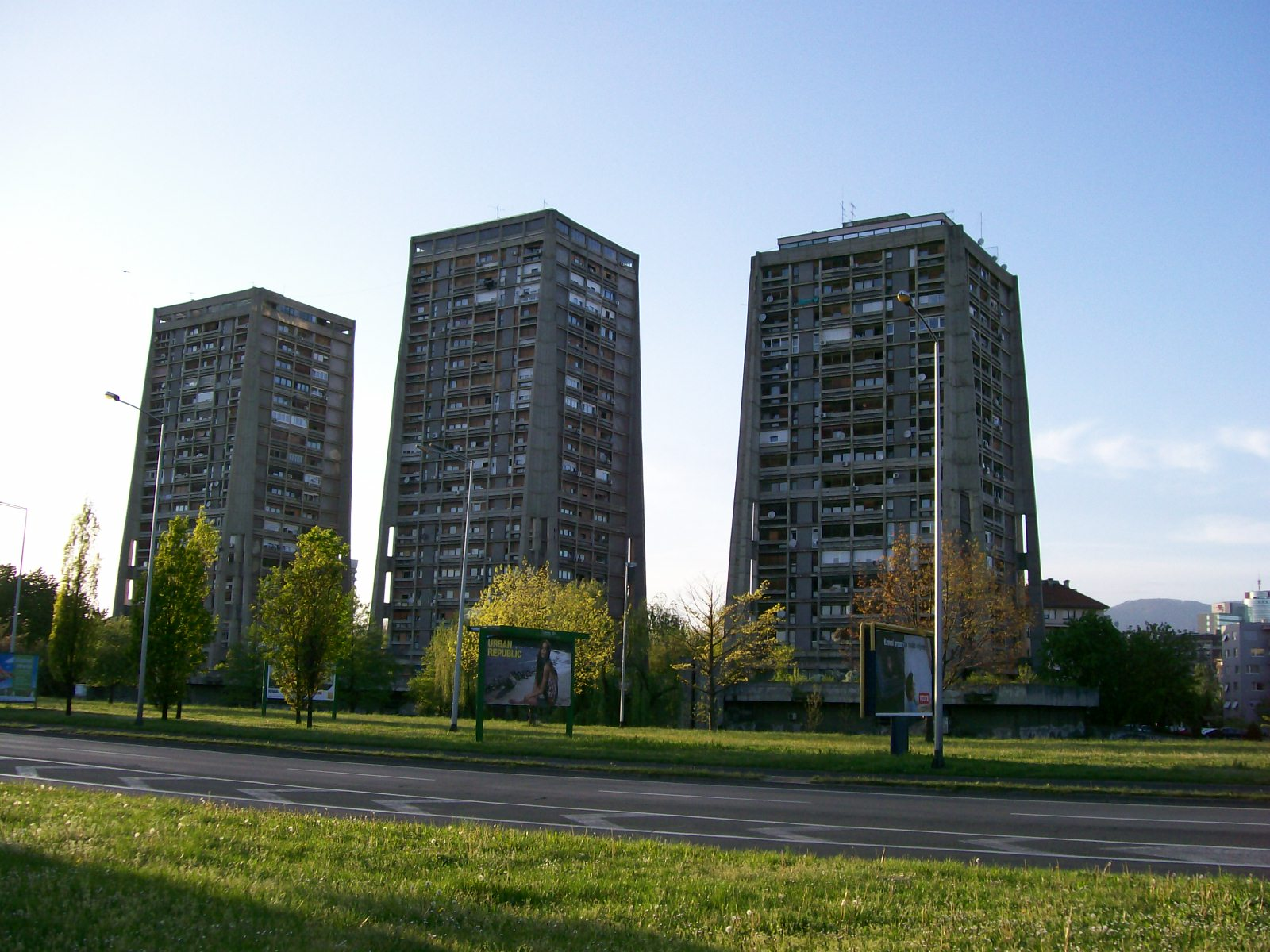
Richter's Skyscrapers, colloquially known as "Rockets", are three high-rise buildings located at Zeleni trg in Vrbik, part of Trnje

- Cvjetnica
- Cvjetno naselje
- Kanal (incl. Zavrtnica)
- "Marin Držić"
- Martinovka
- Miramare
- Savski kuti
- Savica
- Sigečica
- Staro Trnje
- Trnje (Kruge)
- Veslačko naselje
- Vrbik
