= Trnjanska Savica =

Neighbourhood in Zagreb, Croatia

Trnjanska Savica Savica
- Neighbourhood
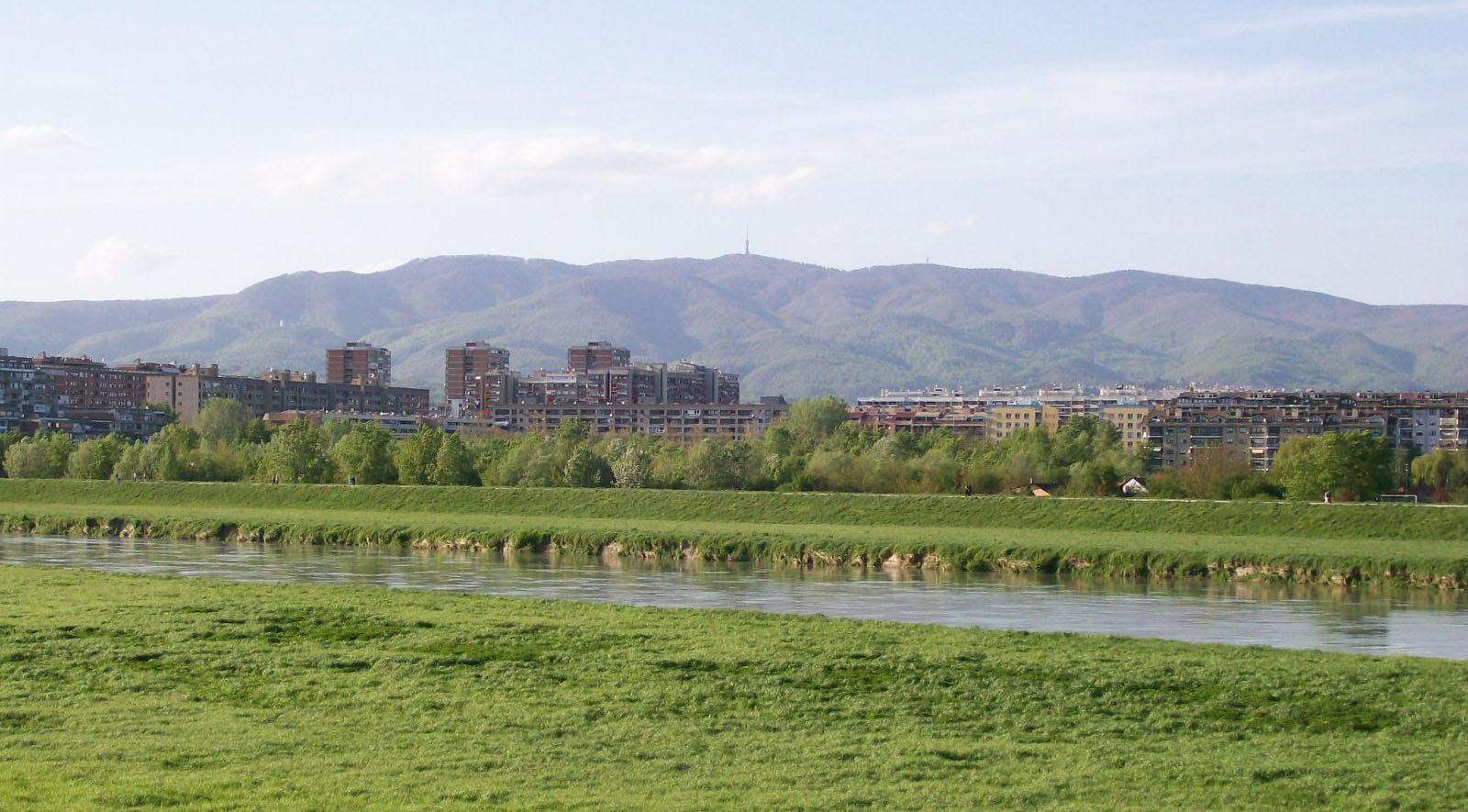
- Interactive map of Trnjanska Savica
- Coordinates: 45°47′30″N 15°59′40″E
- Country: Croatia
- County: City of Zagreb
- City district: Trnje
- Founded: 1999

Area
  - Total: 0.768 km^{2} (0.297 sq mi)

Population (2011)
  - Total: 8,449
- Time zone: UTC+1 (CET)
  - Summer (DST): UTC+2 (CEST)
- Postal code: HR-10 000
- Area code: +385 1
- Vehicle registration: ZG

Trnjanska Savica or just Savica is a neighbourhood of Zagreb, Croatia, located on the left (northern) bank of Sava river, west of Folnegovićevo naselje and east of Staro Trnje, in the city district of Trnje. The neighbourhood covers an area of 76.8 hectares (190 acres) and, according to the 2011 census, has a population of 8,449 people.

Savica was built according to the socialist model of a functional neighbourhood, which is planned to fulfill all day-to-day needs of its inhabitants. Construction of high-rise apartment buildings in Savica is still ongoing, mostly in the southeastern part of the neighbourhood.

The neighbourhood is served by the Jure Kaštelan Elementary School, Savica Farmer's Market, Savica Library and State Geodetic Directorate of Croatia, and belongs to the Parish of blessed Aloysius Stepinac.

== Sport ==
- NK Croatia 98 - football club
- HTK Chromos Savica - tennis club

== Gallery ==
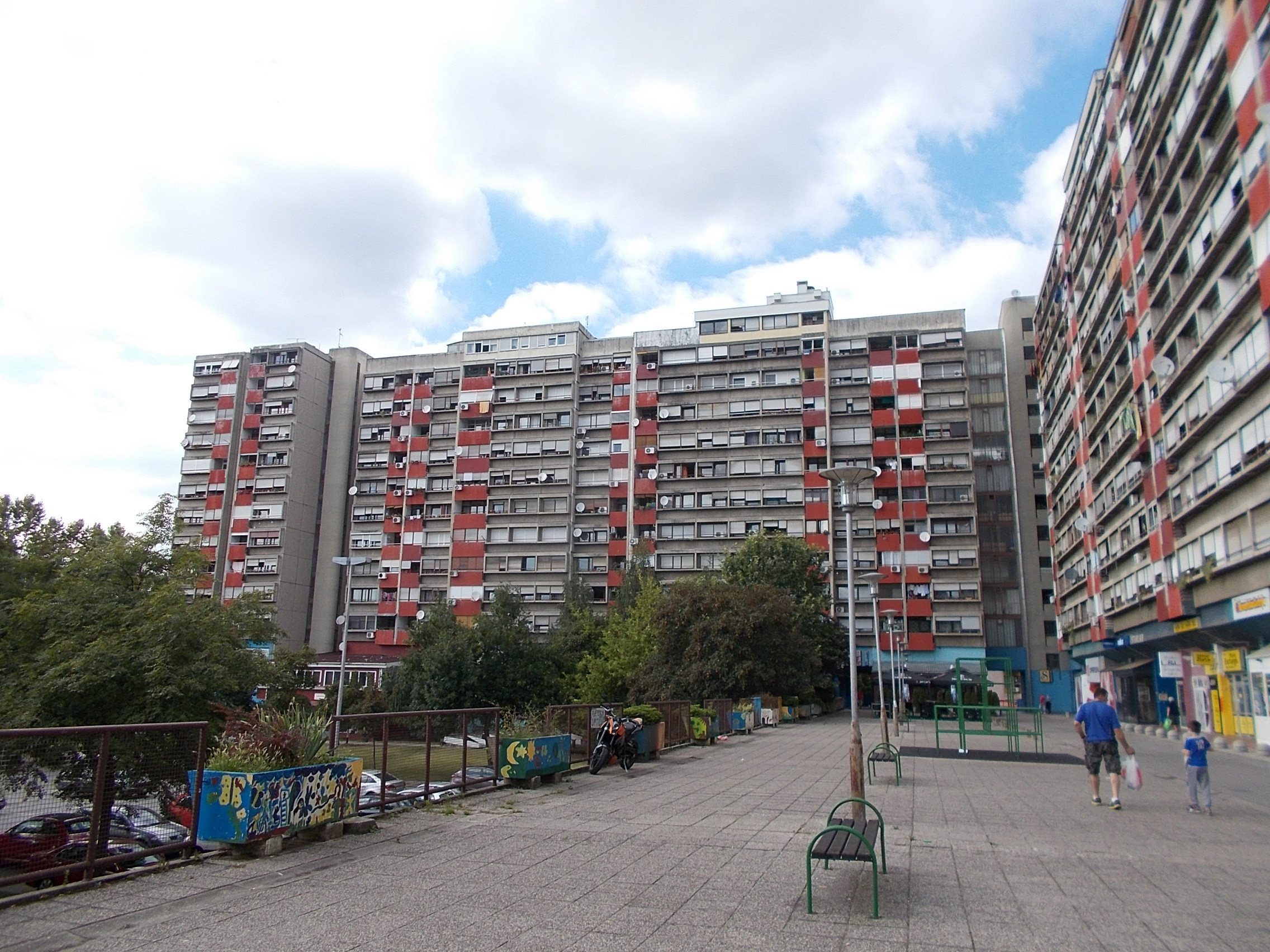
The largest apartment building in Savica, known colloquially as the "officer's skyscraper"

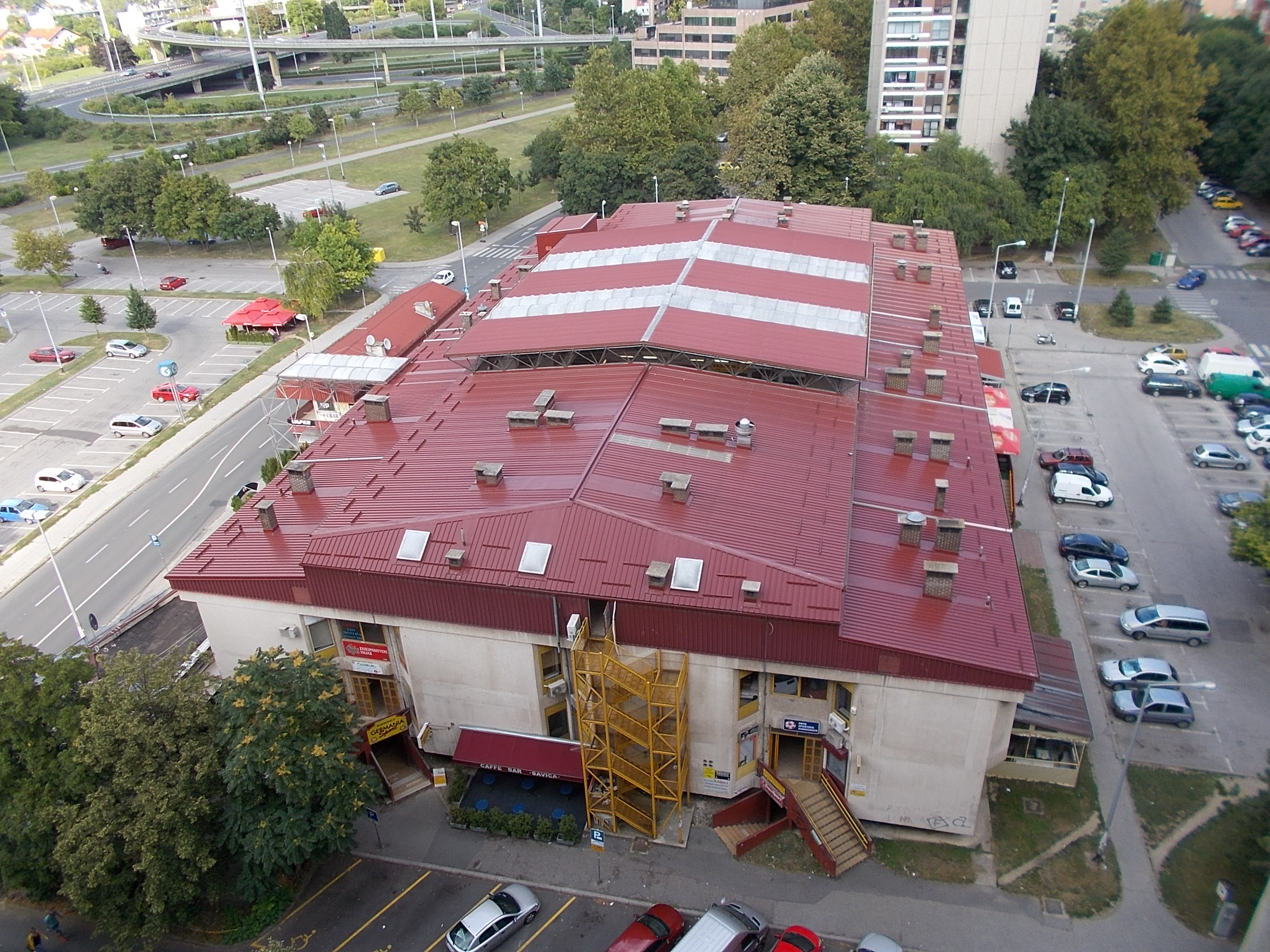
Savica Farmer's Market

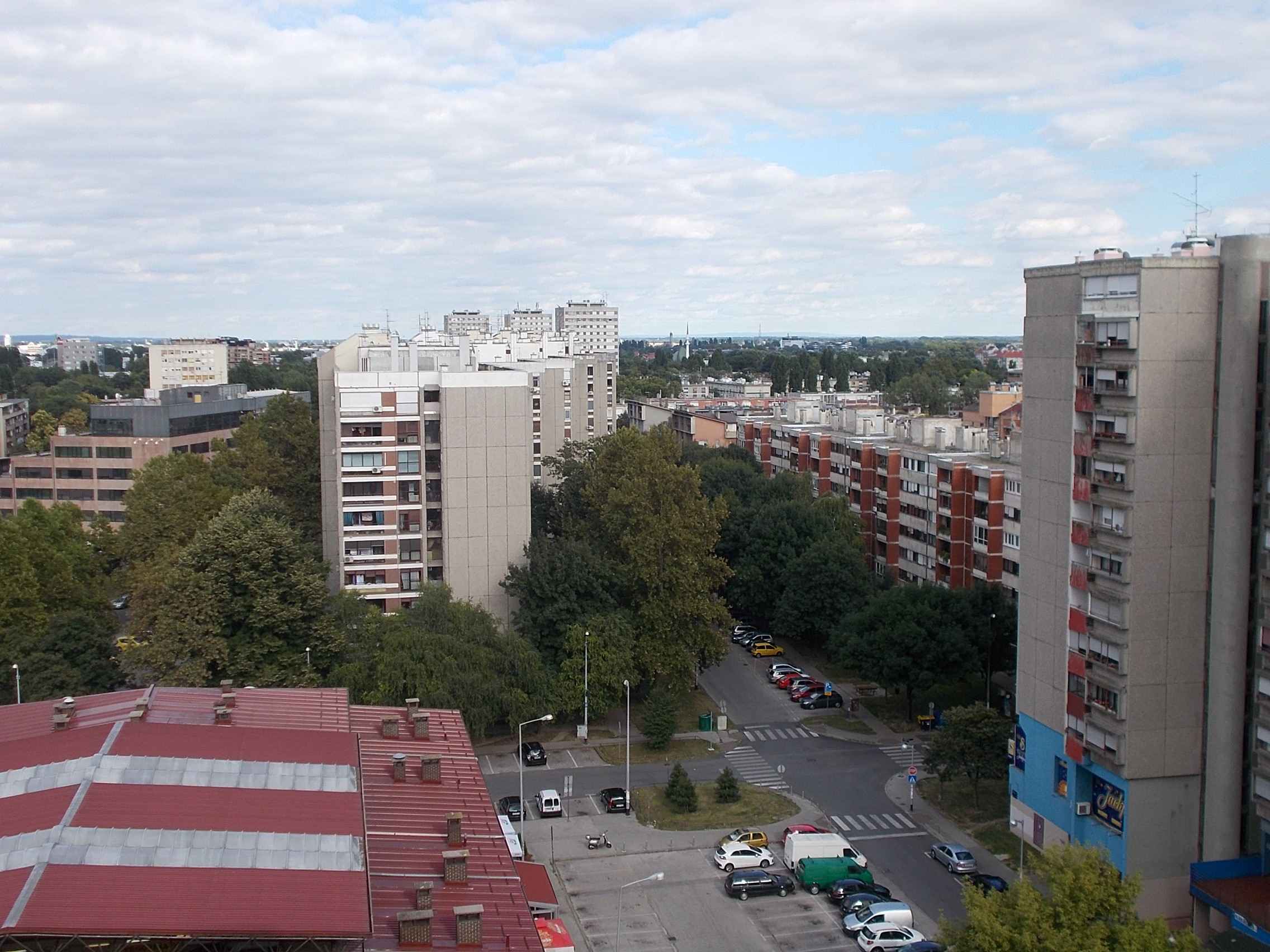
Typical Savica architecture
