= Inkerpor =

Inkerpor d.o.o.
- Company type: Manufacture
- Industry: Porcelain production
- Founded: 2009.
- Headquarters: Zaprešić, Croatia
- Website: www.inkerpor.hr/company/

Inkerpor d.o.o. is Croatian porcelain manufacturer based in Zaprešić. It is owned by Spanish company Porvasal S. A.

== History ==
The first porcelain manufacturer on the factory's current location was Jugokeramika, founded in 1953. During the period of Socialist Federal Republic of Yugoslavia, its brand became well known throughout the country while its products were also exported worldwide. In July 1991. The company changed name to Inker. In 2010. Inker was sold to Porvasal which continued the manufacture via a company named Inkerpor, which also took over the Inker brand.

== See also ==
- NK Inter Zaprešić
