= Lijevi Dubrovčak =

- Village
- Location within Croatia
- Coordinates: 45°39′N 16°21′E
- Country: Croatia
- County: Zagreb County

Area
  - Total: 6.9 km^{2} (2.7 sq mi)

Population (2021)
  - Total: 324
  - Density: 47/km^{2} (120/sq mi)
- Time zone: UTC+1 (CET)
  - Summer (DST): UTC+2 (CEST)

Lijevi Dubrovčak is a village in Croatia.
