= Ravnice, Zagreb =

Neighbourhood of Zagreb, Croatia

Ravnice
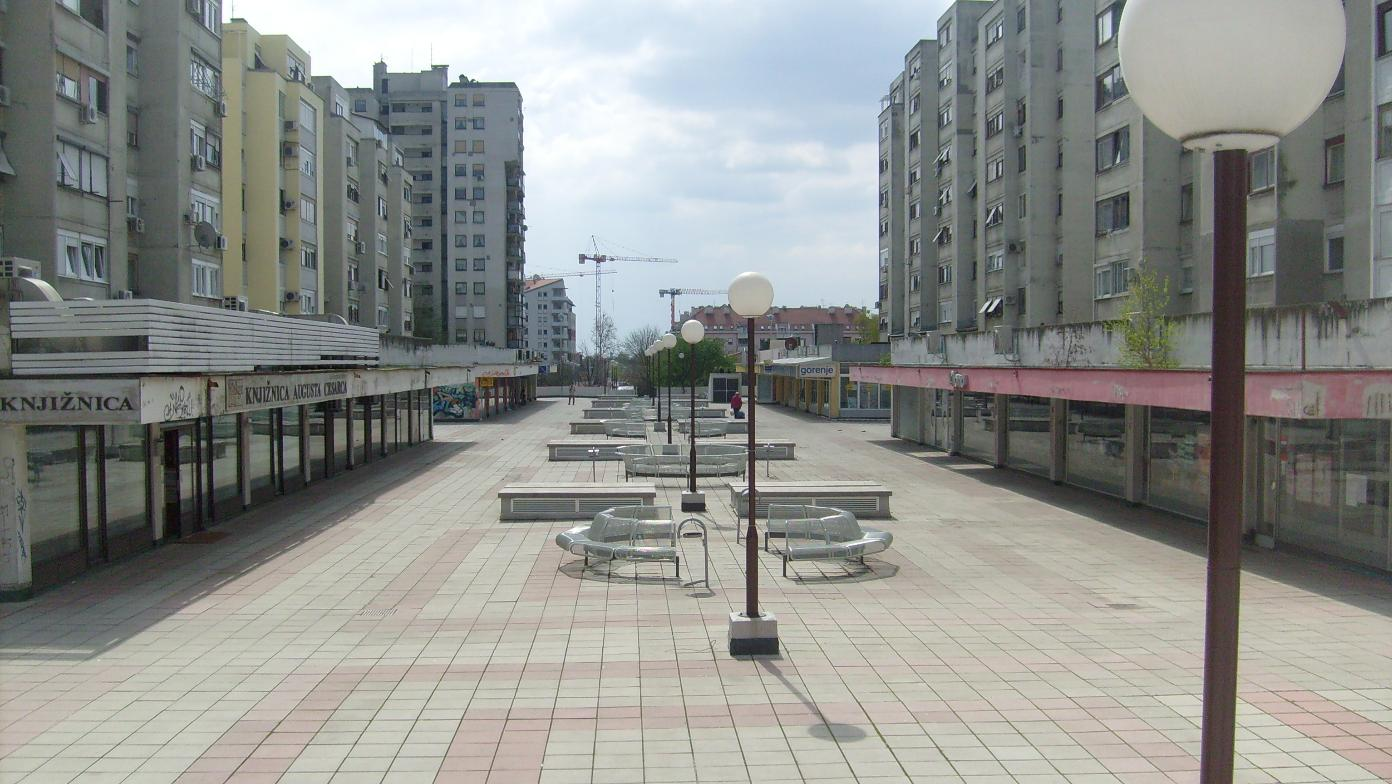
- The plateau between the Vanje Radauša and Vilka Šeferova streets
- Interactive map of Ravnice
- Coordinates: 45.817°N 16.025°E

Ravnice is a neighbourhood in the northeast of Zagreb, Croatia, within the Maksimir district. The area of the local city council of Maksimirska naselja (lit. 'the settlements of Maksimir') has a population of 8,308 (census 2021).

The area is a lowland south of the Maksimir Park. It includes the area of the Zagreb Zoo and the Maksimir Stadium.
