= Kanal, Zagreb =

Neighbourhood of Zagreb, Croatia

Coordinates: 45°48.2′N 15°59.9′E

Kanal
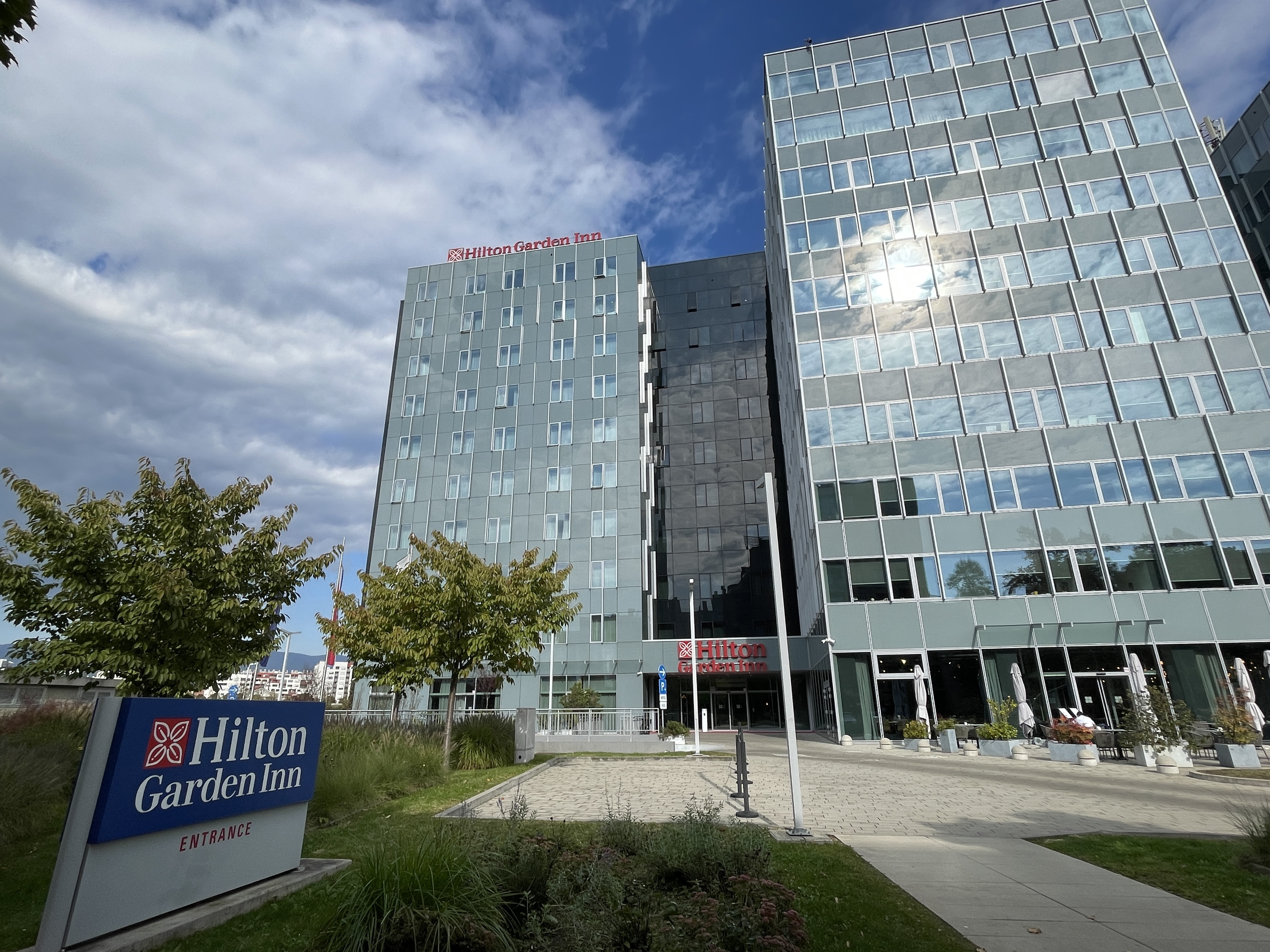
- Hilton Garden Inn hotel in Kanal, Zagreb
- Interactive map of Kanal

Kanal is a neighborhood in the city district of Trnje in Zagreb, Croatia. The main residential part of the neighbourhood is located northeast of the intersection of Vukovarska Avenue and Marin Držić Avenue and south of Radnička Road. The population is 1,384 (2021).

Kanal (lit. 'channel, culvert') was named after the culvert underneath the northernmost section of the Radnička Road, the construction of which happened in the interwar period. The northeastern half of the area is an industrial zone, the location of the city's gasworks, a former asphalt factory, a former slaughterhouse etc. In more recent times, this area has seen major transformation with construction of office buildings, hotels and commercial properties.

The Chromos Tower is located in the southeast corner of the neighbourhood.
