= Gajniče =

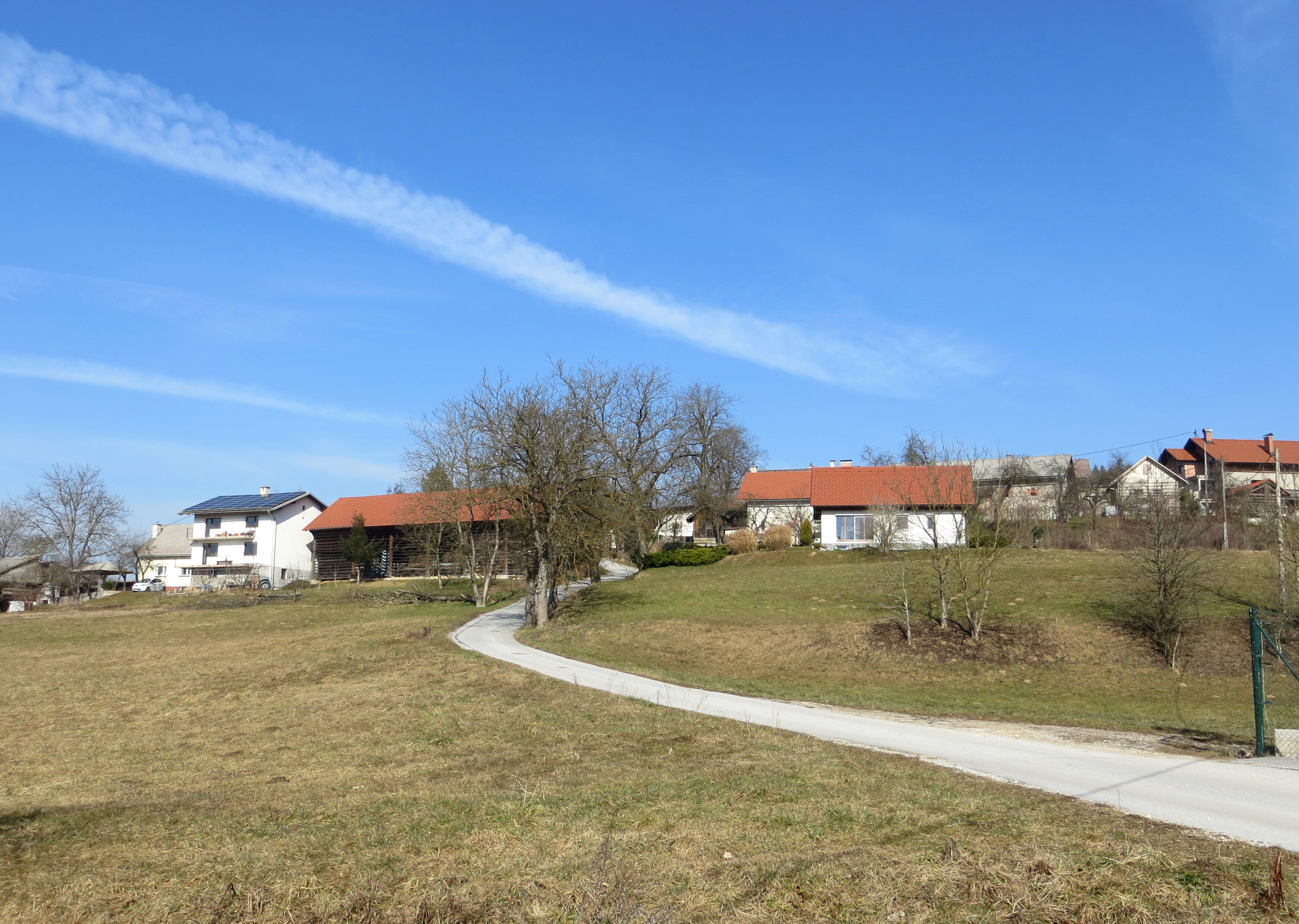

- Location in Slovenia
- Coordinates: 45°58′29.34″N 14°35′48.64″E
- Country: Slovenia
- Traditional region: Lower Carniola
- Statistical region: Central Slovenia
- Municipality: Grosuplje

Area
  - Total: 1.06 km^{2} (0.41 sq mi)
- Elevation: 316.7 m (1,039 ft)

Population (2002)
  - Total: 36

Gajniče (pronounced [ɡai̯ˈniːtʃɛ]; in older sources also Goniče or Gojniče; German: Ganitsche) is a small settlement just southwest of Šmarje–Sap in the Municipality of Grosuplje in central Slovenia. The entire municipality is included in the Central Slovenia Statistical Region. The area is part of the historical region of Lower Carniola.

== Geography ==
Gajniče is a clustered village on the southern slope of Roj Hill (330 m), which also has a railroad tunnel. A wet, marshy valley lies below the village, through which Tlake Creek (Slovene: Tlaški potok) flows, with its source at Vir Spring below the hamlet of Razdrto. The creek flows through the low-lying Snožeti Meadows. Klobušter Hill (396 m) and Mačka Hill (397 m) rise above the settlement to the south.
