= Sigečica =

Neighbourhood of Zagreb, Croatia

Coordinates: 45°48′27″N 16°01′22″E

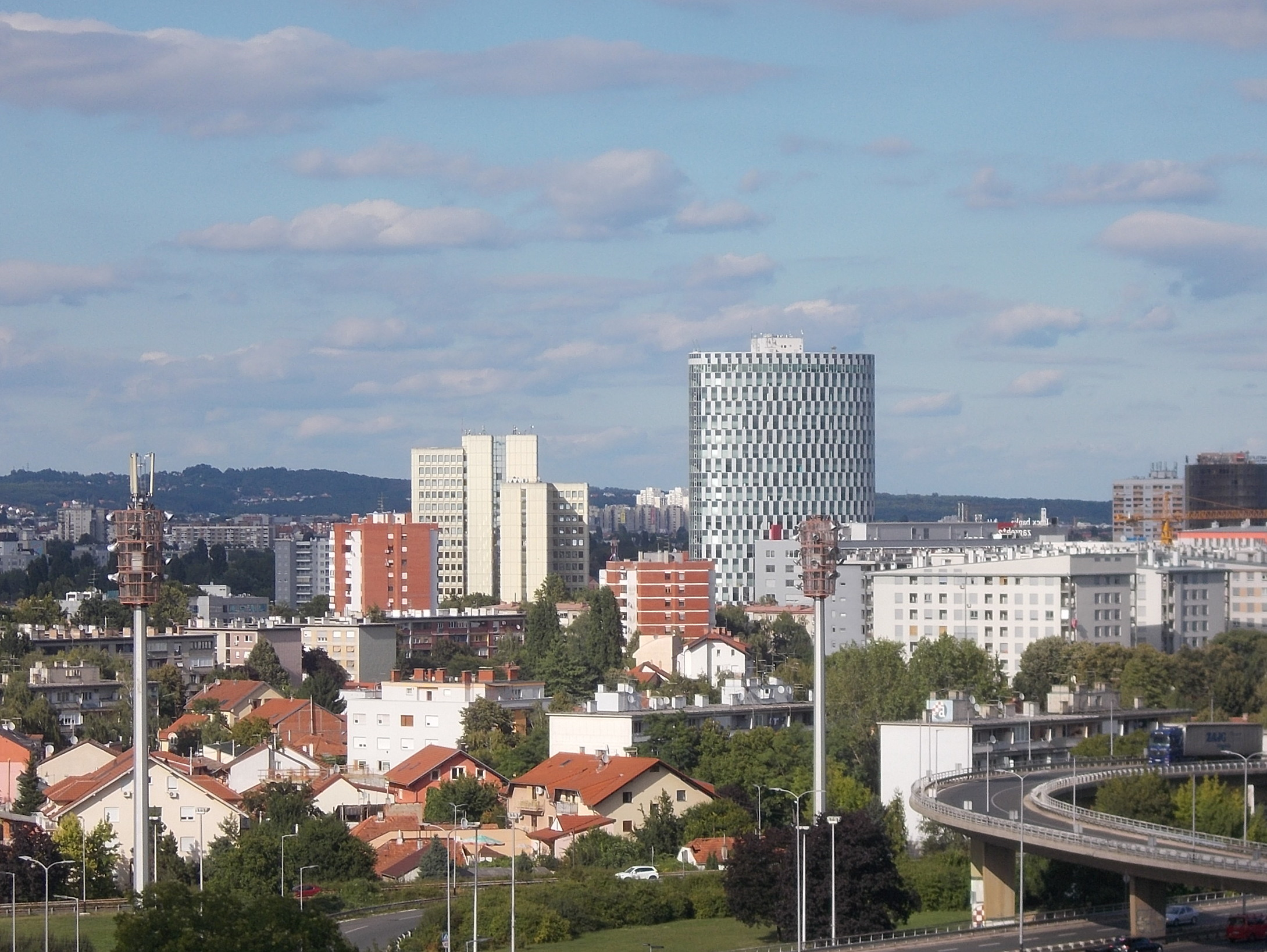
- View of Sigečica from the southeast, with Zagrebtower most prominent.
- Interactive map of Sigečica

Sigečica is a neighbourhood in the southeast of Zagreb, Croatia, within the Trnje district. The area of the local city council of Sigečica has a population of 6,077 (census 2021).

The name Sigečica comes from old river islands in the Sava river valley, and city planners decided to name a lot of the neighbourhood streets after Adriatic islands.

Sigečica became urbanized and integrated into the city in the late 1920s.
