= Jakuševec =

Neighbourhood of Zagreb, Croatia

Coordinates: 45°46′N 16°01′E

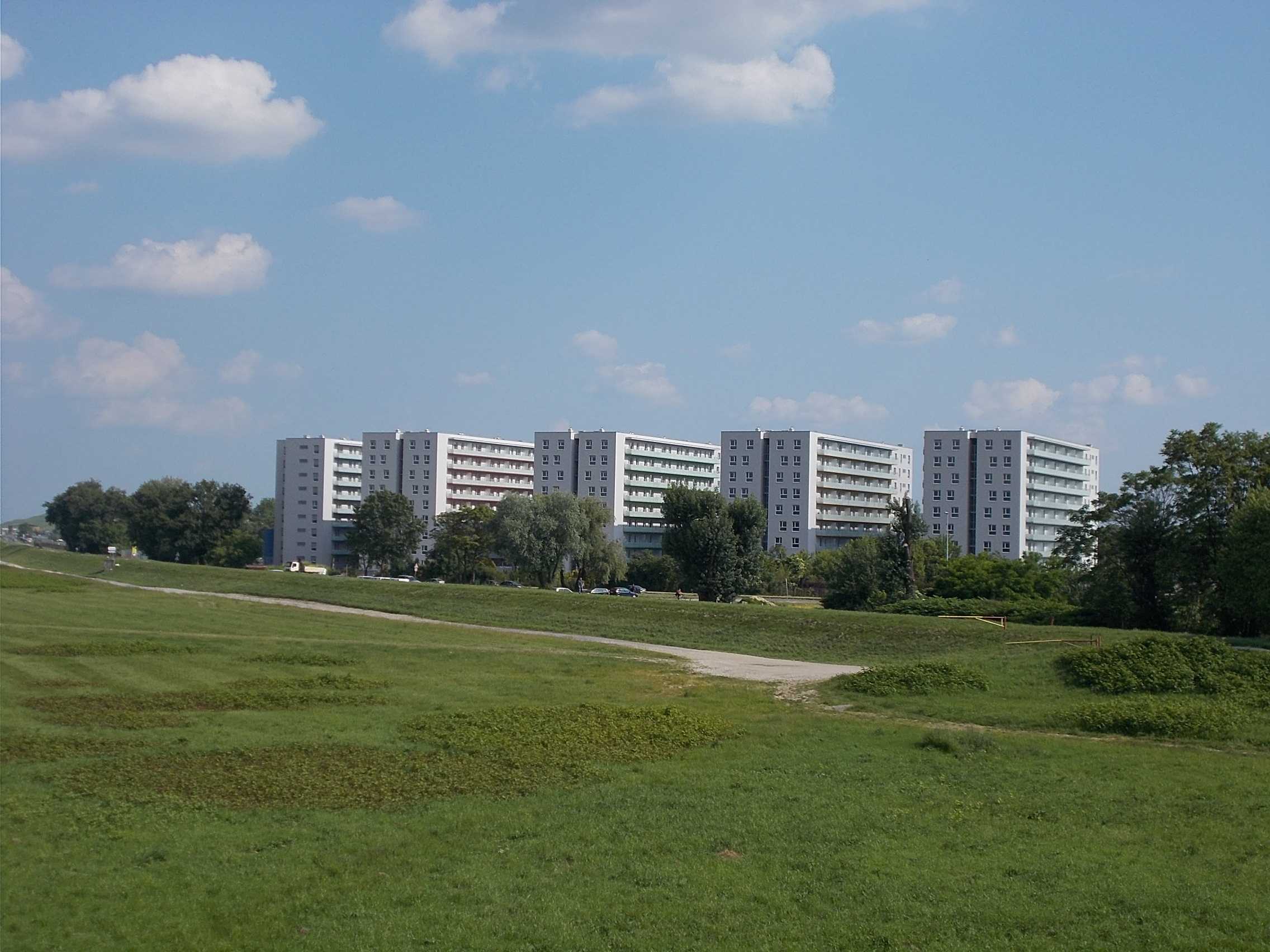
Residential buildings in the northern corner of Jakuševec, near Zapruđe

Jakuševec is a neighborhood in the Novi Zagreb – istok city district of Zagreb, the capital of Croatia. Located on Sajmišna Road east of Sarajevska Road and Utrine, Travno and Dugave apartment block complexes, the area of 455.21 ha is mostly uninhabited. In the 2021 census it did have a total population of 4,324, with buildings in the southwest (old village site) and the north (new construction).

The southeast of Jakuševec, by the Sava, is the site of the city's largest landfill, formally called Prudinec. The city's biggest used car market, often referred to as 'Hrelić', is located north of the landfill, though Hrelić is actually a separate settlement located further to the southwest.

The first records of inhabitants in Jakuševec area date back to 1334 as "Parochia Sancti Marci Ev. in campo" (English: Parish of St. Mark the Evangelist in the field), which is the name recorded up to 1501. At that time, the parish' name is changed to "Parocha Sancti Marci Ev. in spinis" (English: Parish of St. Mark the Evangelist among the thorns). However, during the leadership of pastor Josip Vitković, the parish is renamed in 1871 to "Parish of Jakuševec" (Croatian: Jakuševečka župa).

The Church of St. Mark the Evangelist was built in Jakuševec in 1832.

Jakuševec remained a standalone village until 1991 when it was integrated along with several adjacent villages into the City of Zagreb.

== See also ==
- 1964 Zagreb flood
