= Bundek =

Park in Zagreb, Croatia

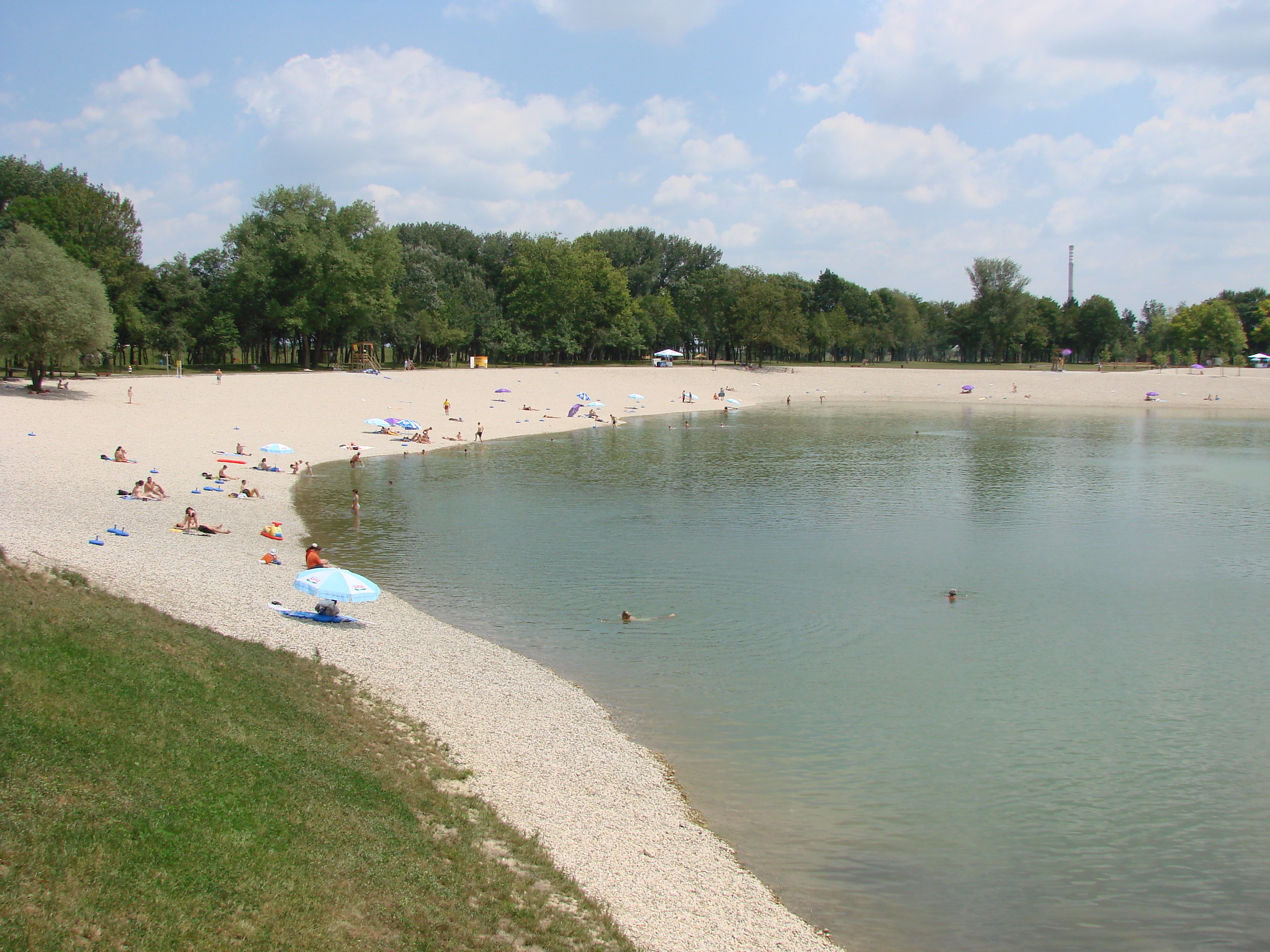
- Veliko jezero on Bundek
- Interactive map of Bundek
- Location: Novi Zagreb - istok, Zagreb
- Coordinates: 45°47′07″N 15°59′14″E
- Operator: Sportsko rekreacijski centar Bundek

Bundek is a park in the Novi Zagreb - istok city district of Zagreb, Croatia. It is located north of the Zapruđe and Središće neighborhoods, across Zagreb Hippodrome and south of Sava river. Bundek was renovated during 2005 to turn a badly maintained lake into a tourism and events center of Novi Zagreb.

Lake Bundek is divided into the Veliko jezero (Big Lake) and the Malo jezero (Little Lake). On the Big Lake, there is a 10,000 m^{2} Bundek Beach, where during the summer season there is a lifeguard and medical service, and the water quality is regularly monitored.

The area around the lake has several recreational opportunities such as areas for cycling, walking, and barbecueing, as well as playgrounds and volleyball courts.

In 2005, the park and lake were completely renovated. The park area is 545,000 m^{2}.

== Gallery ==
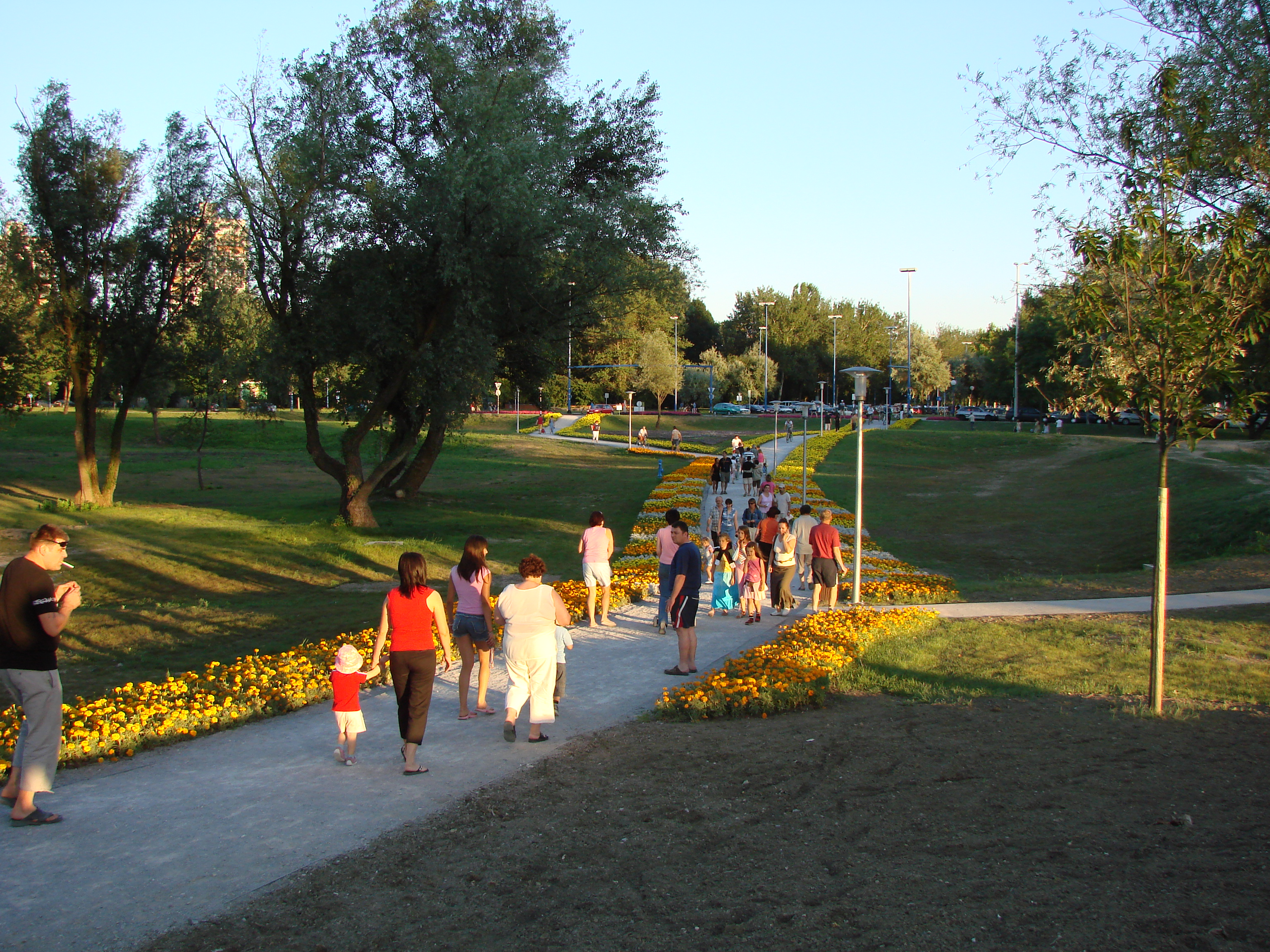
Footpath and flowers in park Bundek

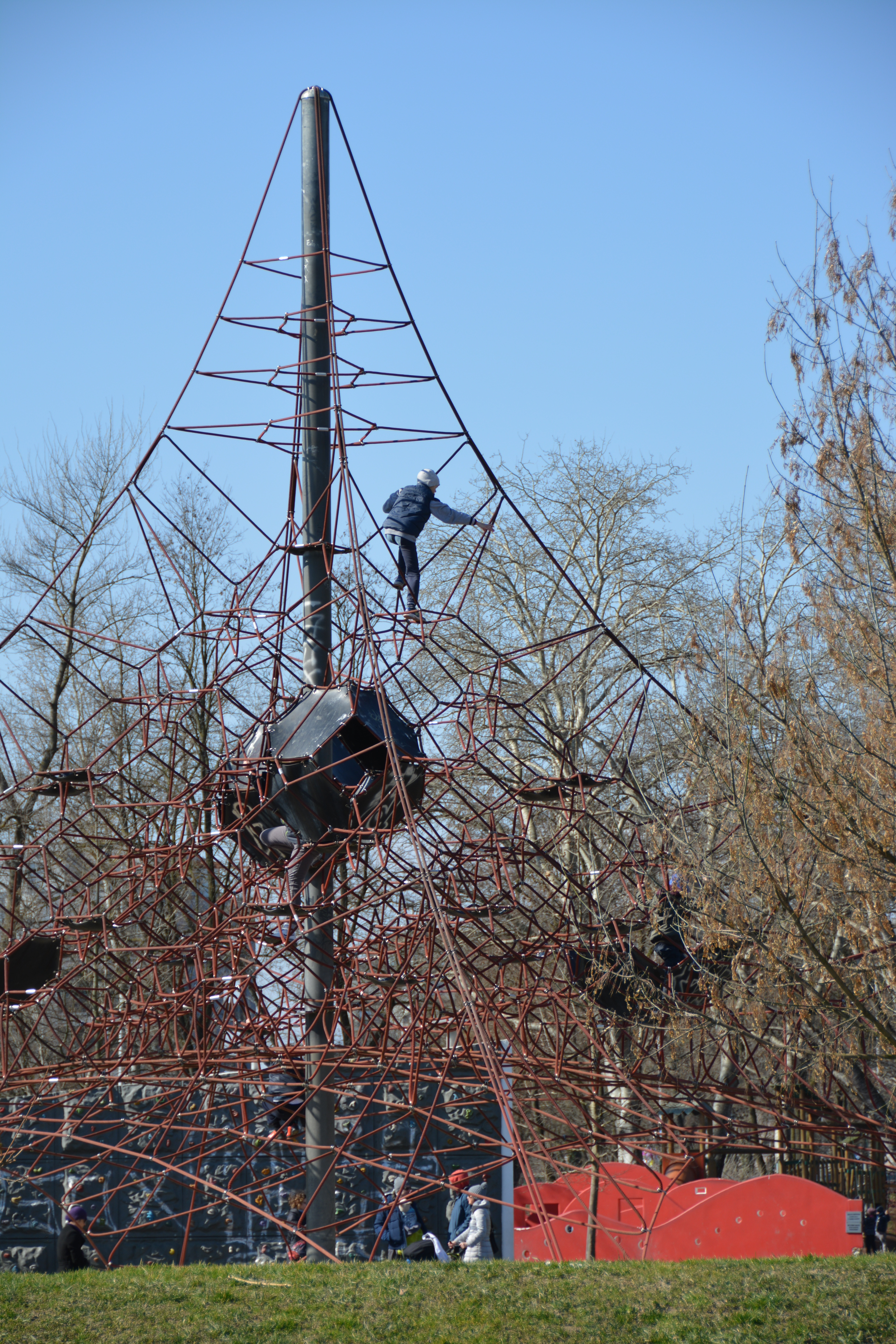
Bundek climbing frame

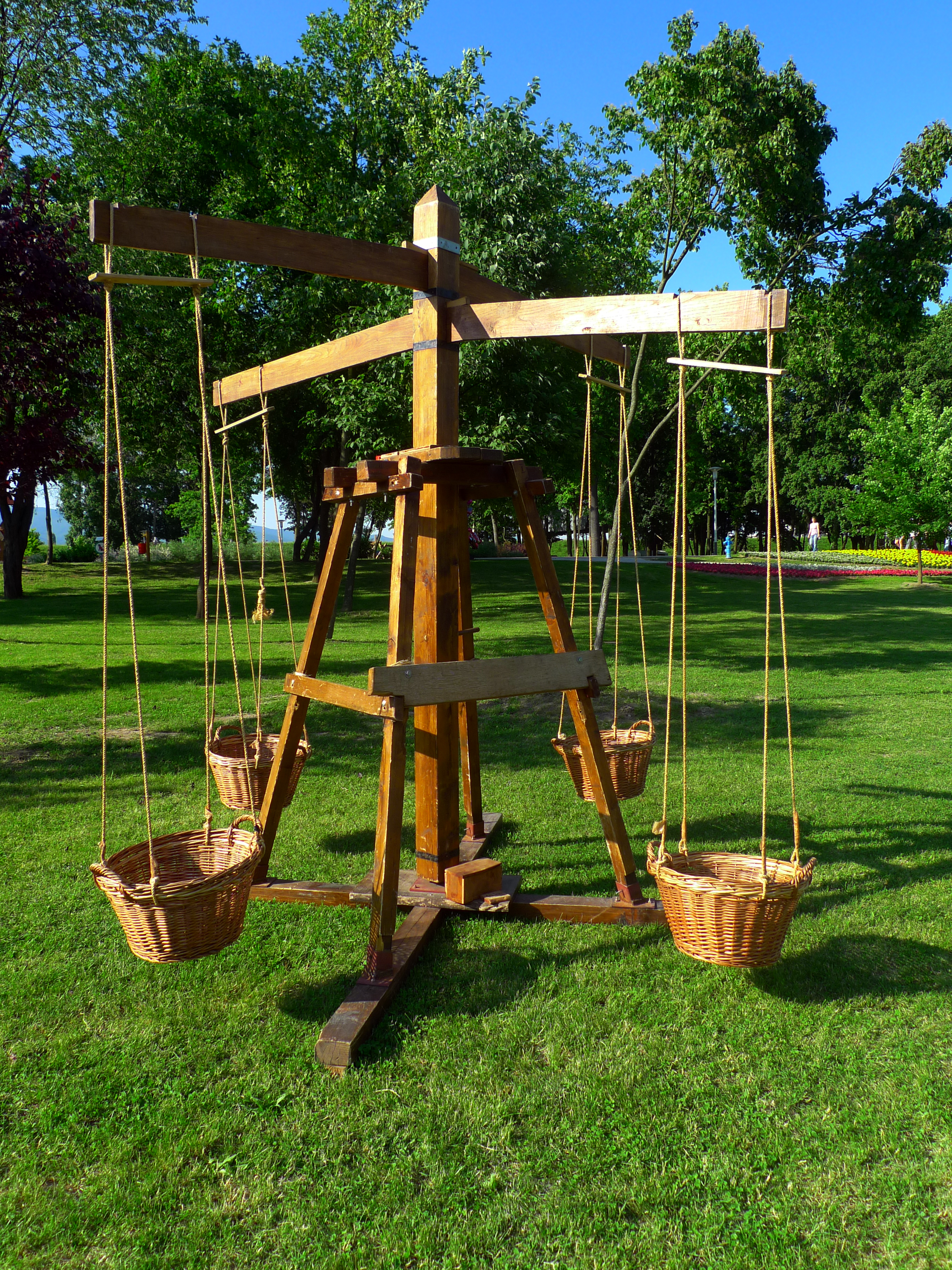
Flora art 2010. Bundek

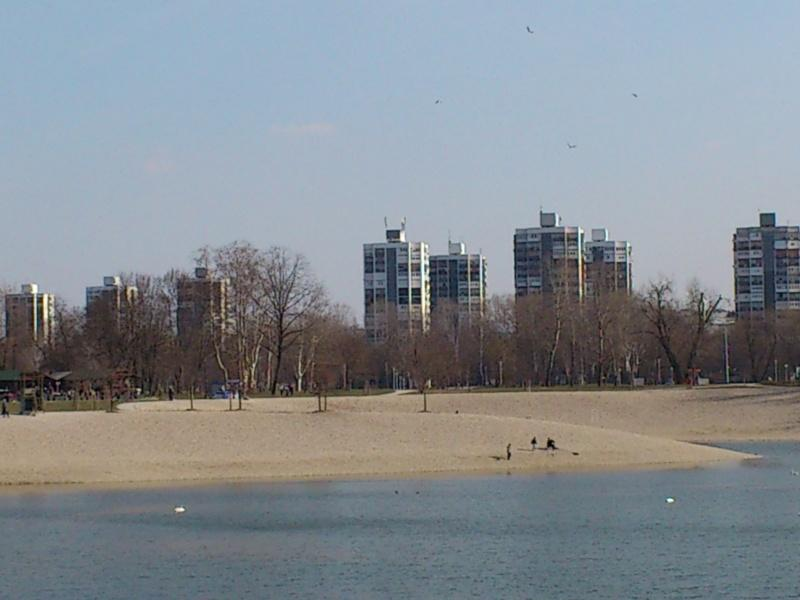
Southeast view to Zapruđe

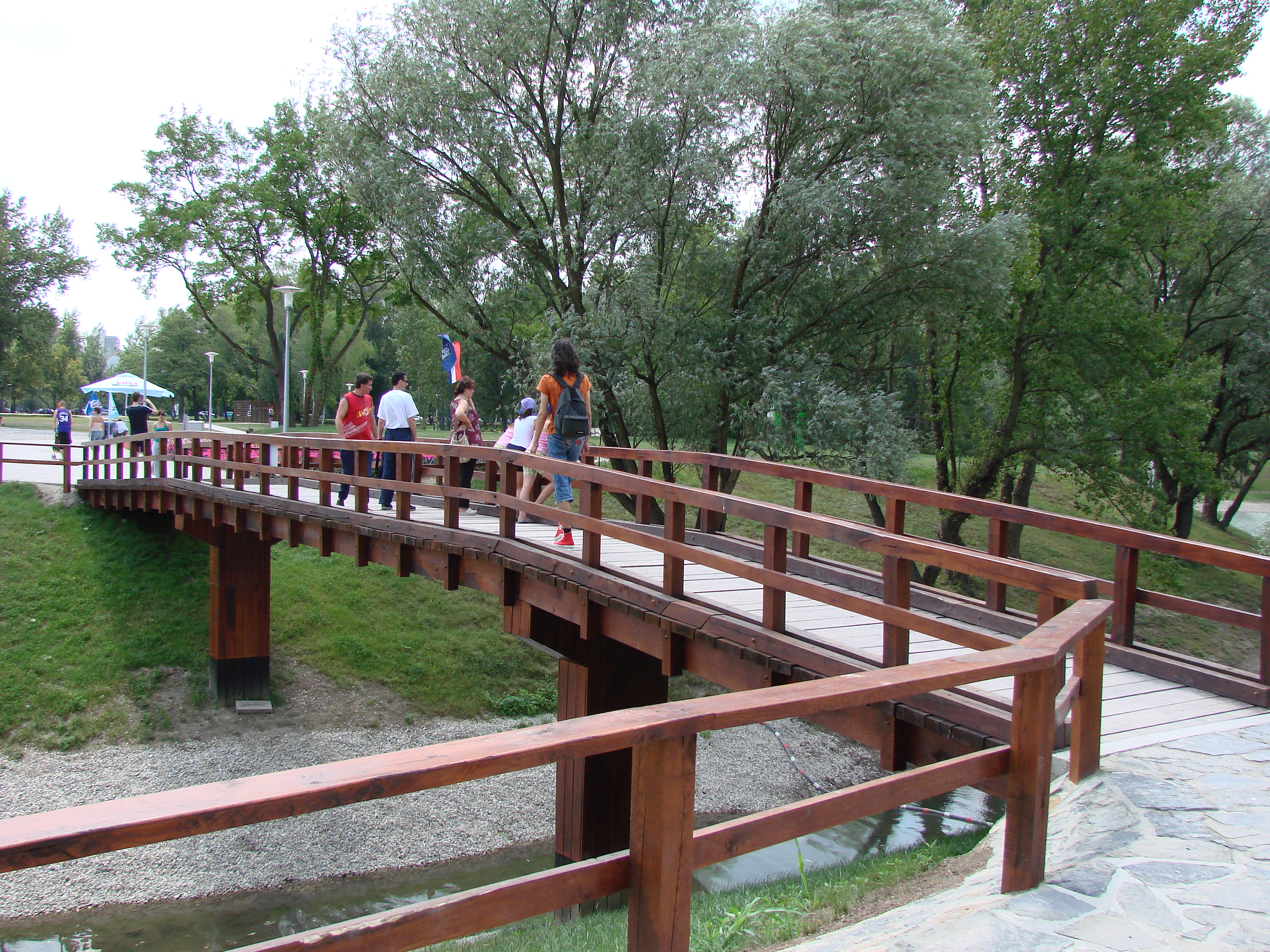
Bridge in park Bundek

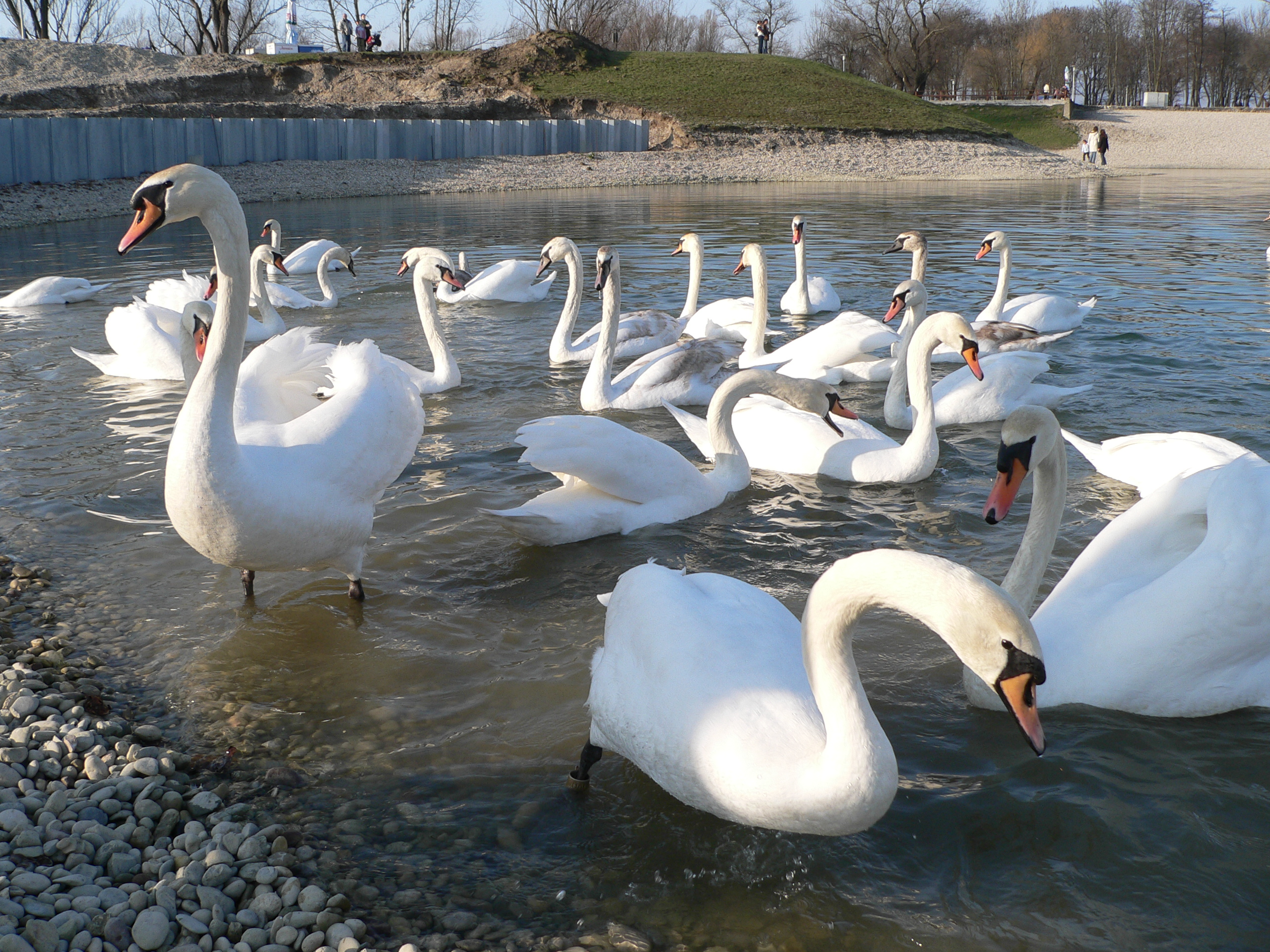
Swans

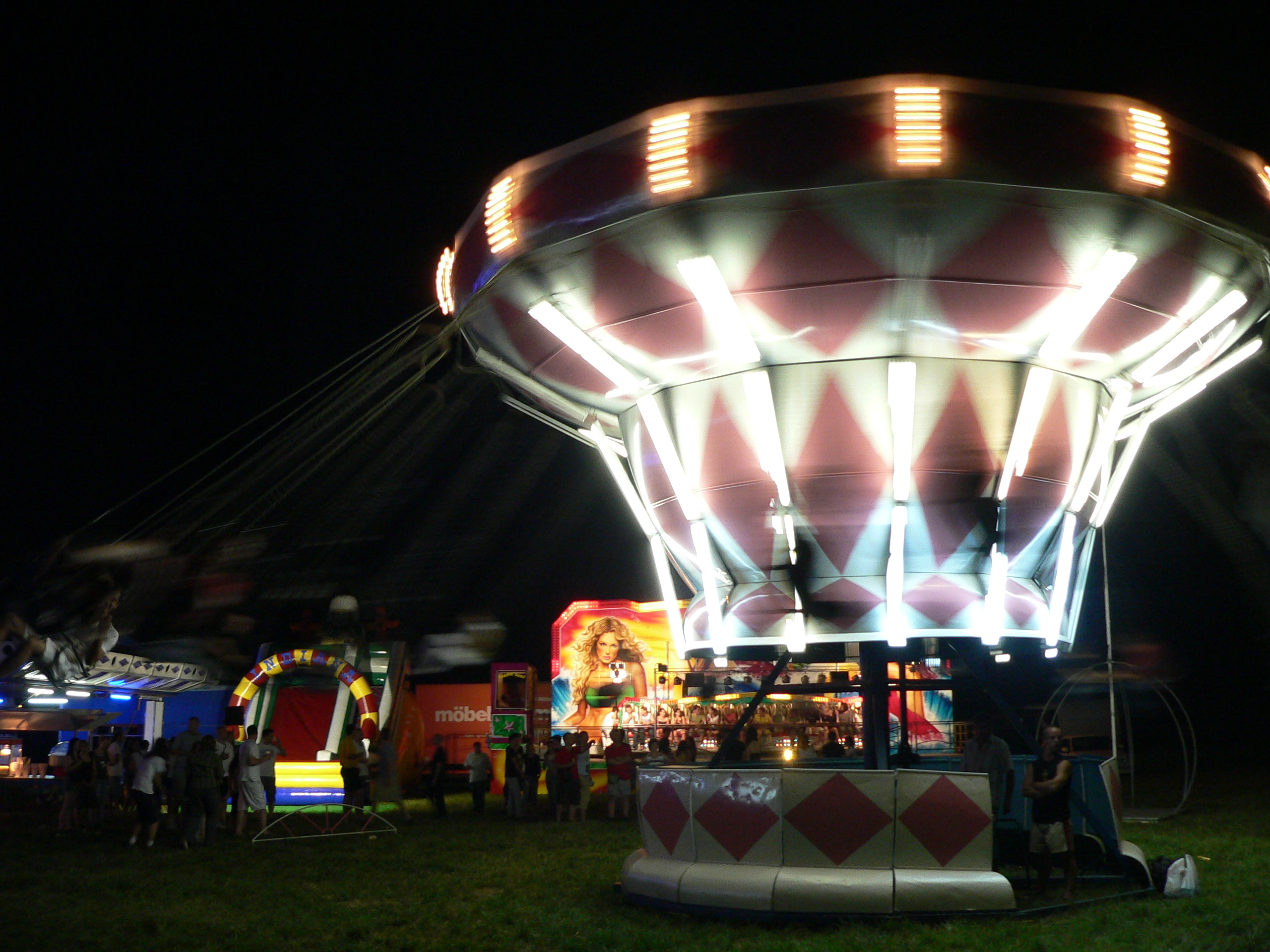
Bundek during the summer festival

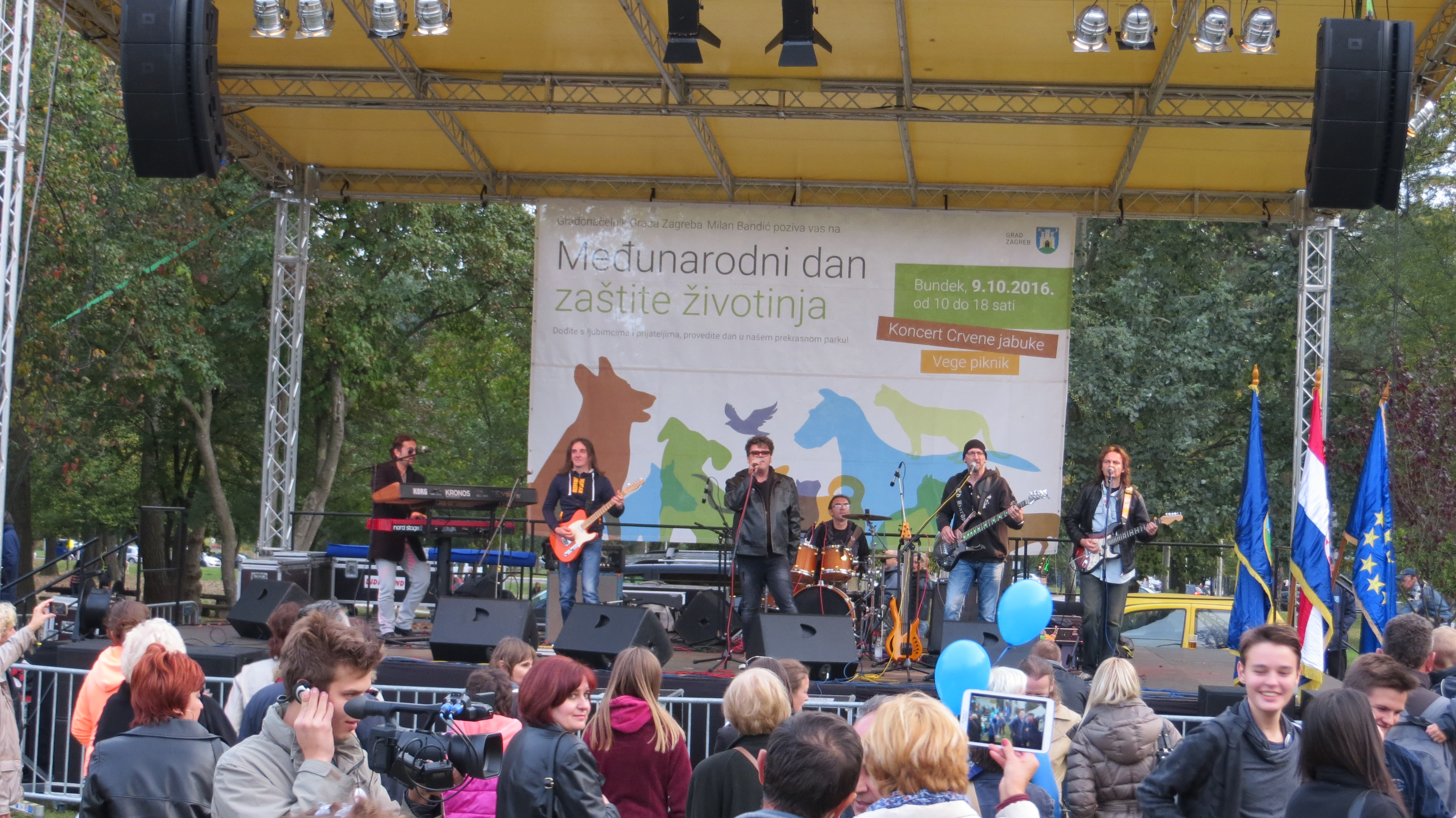
Band Crvena jabuka performing on Bundek
