= Church of the Ascension of the Lord, Zagreb =

Church of the Ascension of the Lord (Croatian: Župna crkva Uzašašća Gospodnjega)
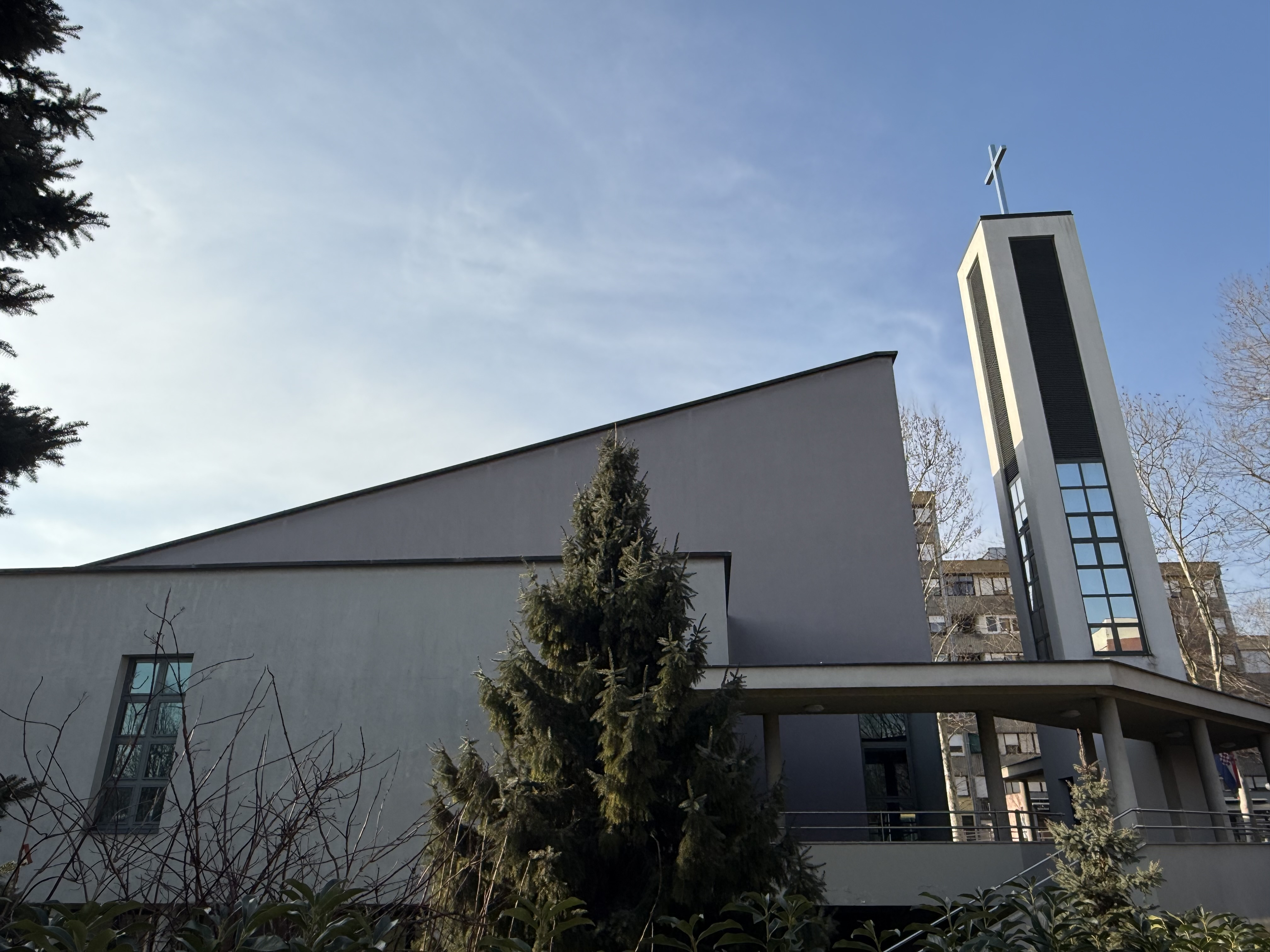
- View of the church
- Church of the Ascension of the Lord (Croatian: Župna crkva Uzašašća Gospodnjega)
- 45°45′50″N 15°59′15″E
- Location: Zagreb
- Country: Croatia
- Denomination: Roman Catholic

Architecture
- Functional status: Active
- Groundbreaking: 1997
- Completed: 2001

Church of the Ascension of the Lord, Zagreb (Croatian: Župna crkva Uzašašća Gospodnjega u Zagrebu) is a Catholic parish church located in the neighbourhood Sloboština of Zagreb, Croatia.

== History ==
It was built from 1997 to 2001. In November 2018, it was consecrated by the Archbishop of Zagreb, Cardinal Josip Bozanić.

== Architecture ==
The parish church of the Ascension of the Lord is located within a residential area, where apartment buildings continue the urban structure of the neighboring settlement Dugave, while the outskirts are marked by low-rise family houses. The church is located along one of the main roads of the area, and a square has been formed in front of it.

The conceptual design for the construction of the church was created by Jagoda Bodić.

The entrance facade is marked by the prominent verticality of the bell tower, which is clearly visible from the access roads.

== Gallery ==
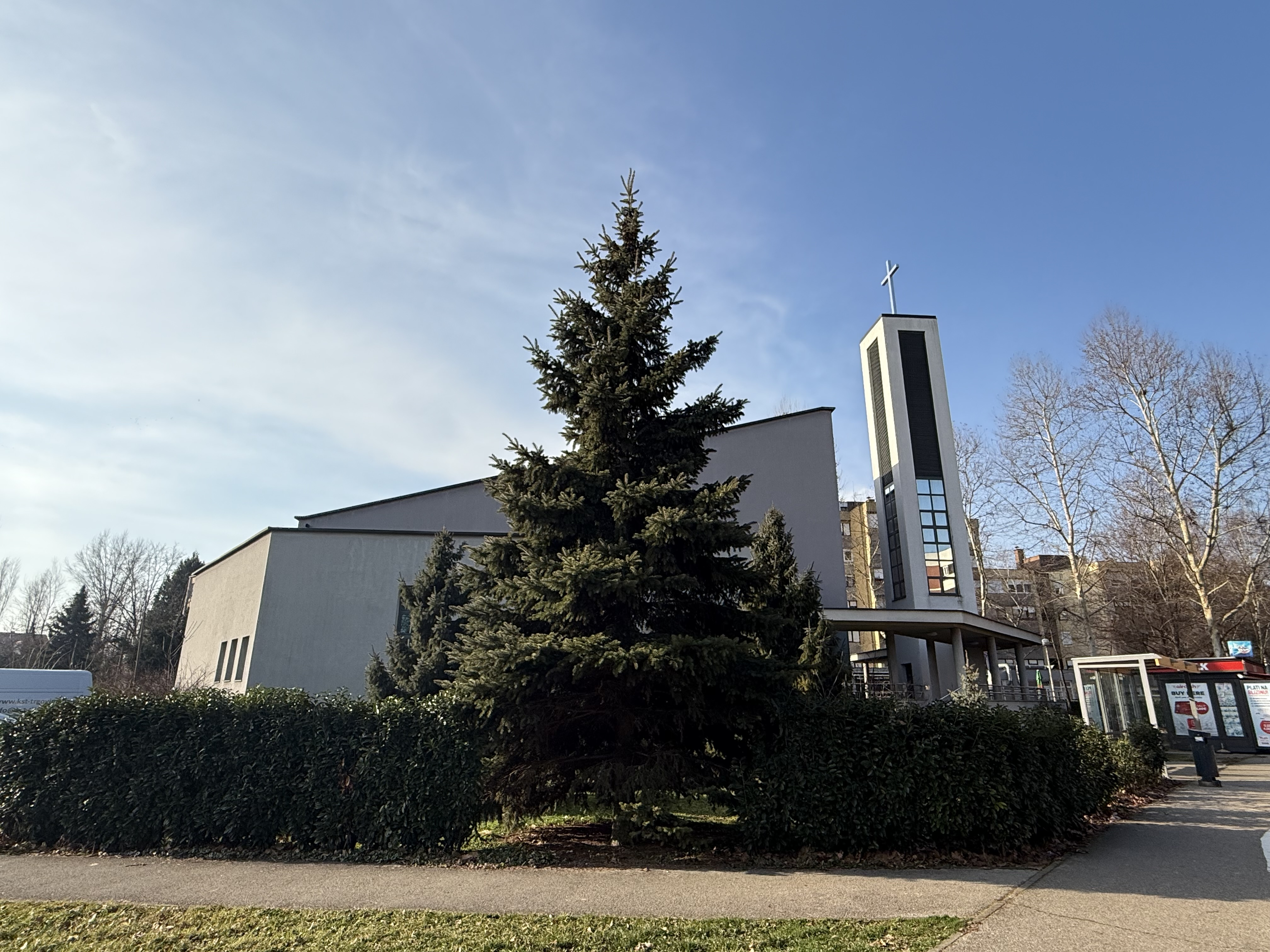
View of the church from a distance

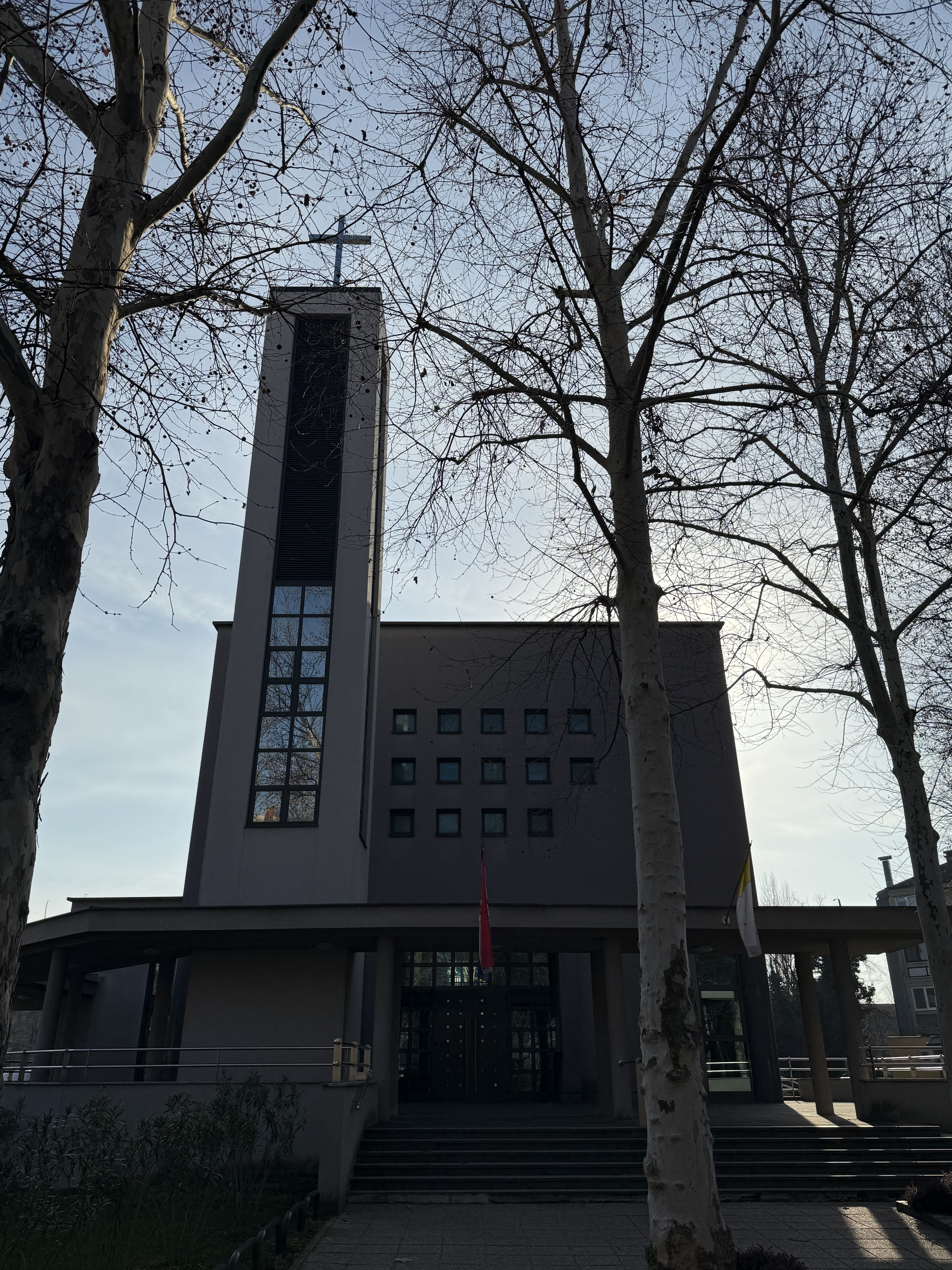
Entrance gate and bell tower

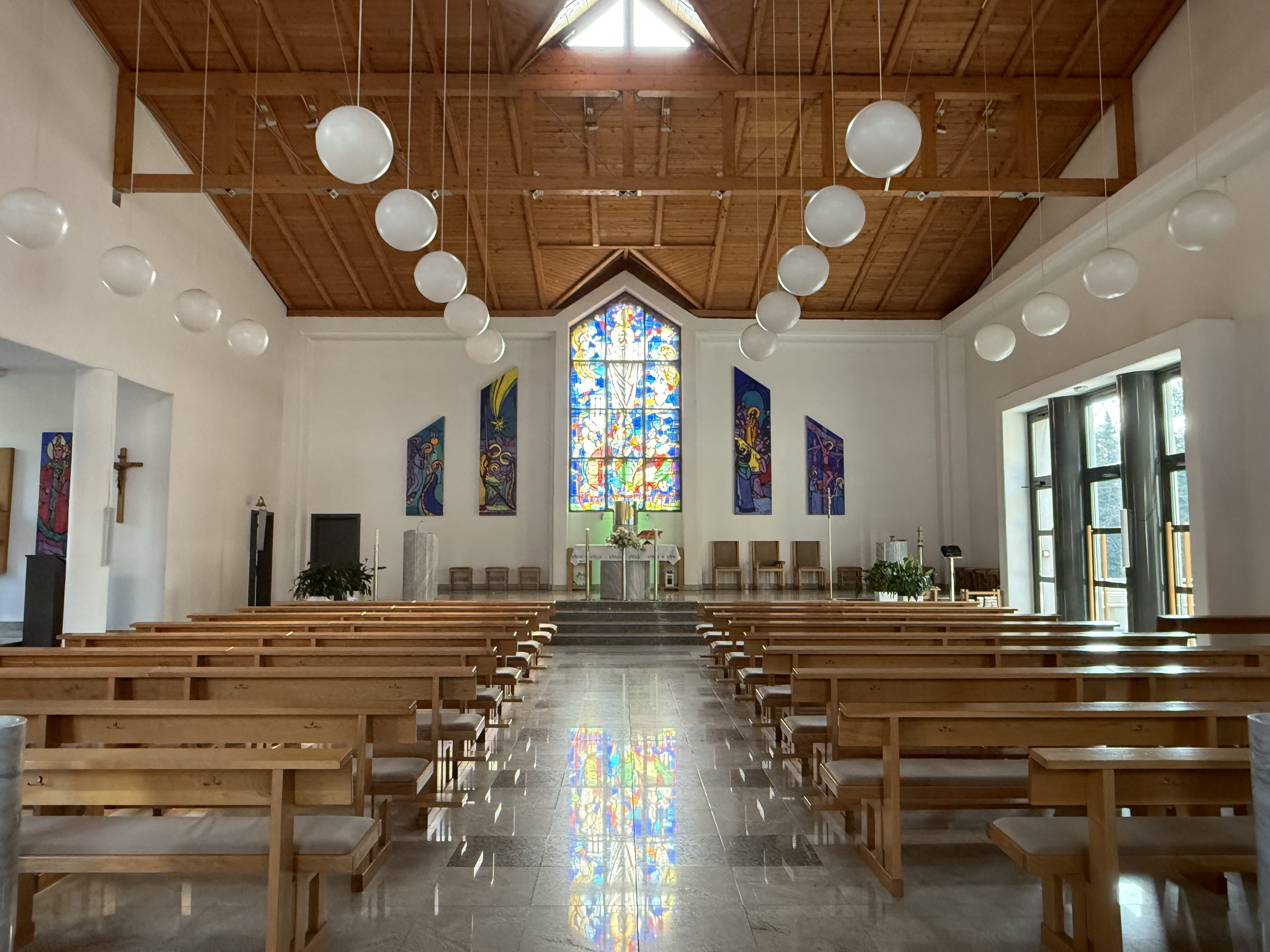
View from the entrance towards the altar

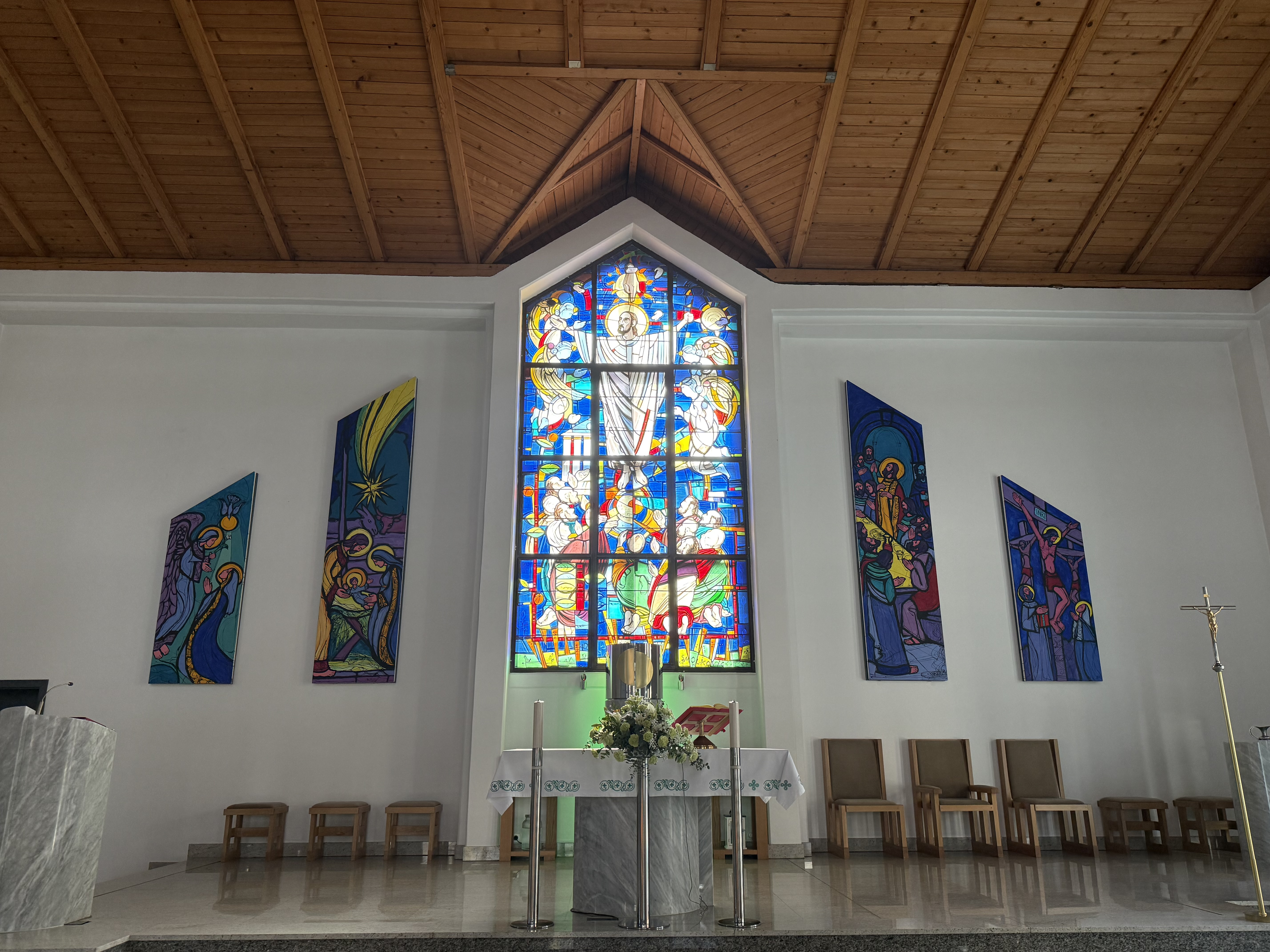
Altar and decorations

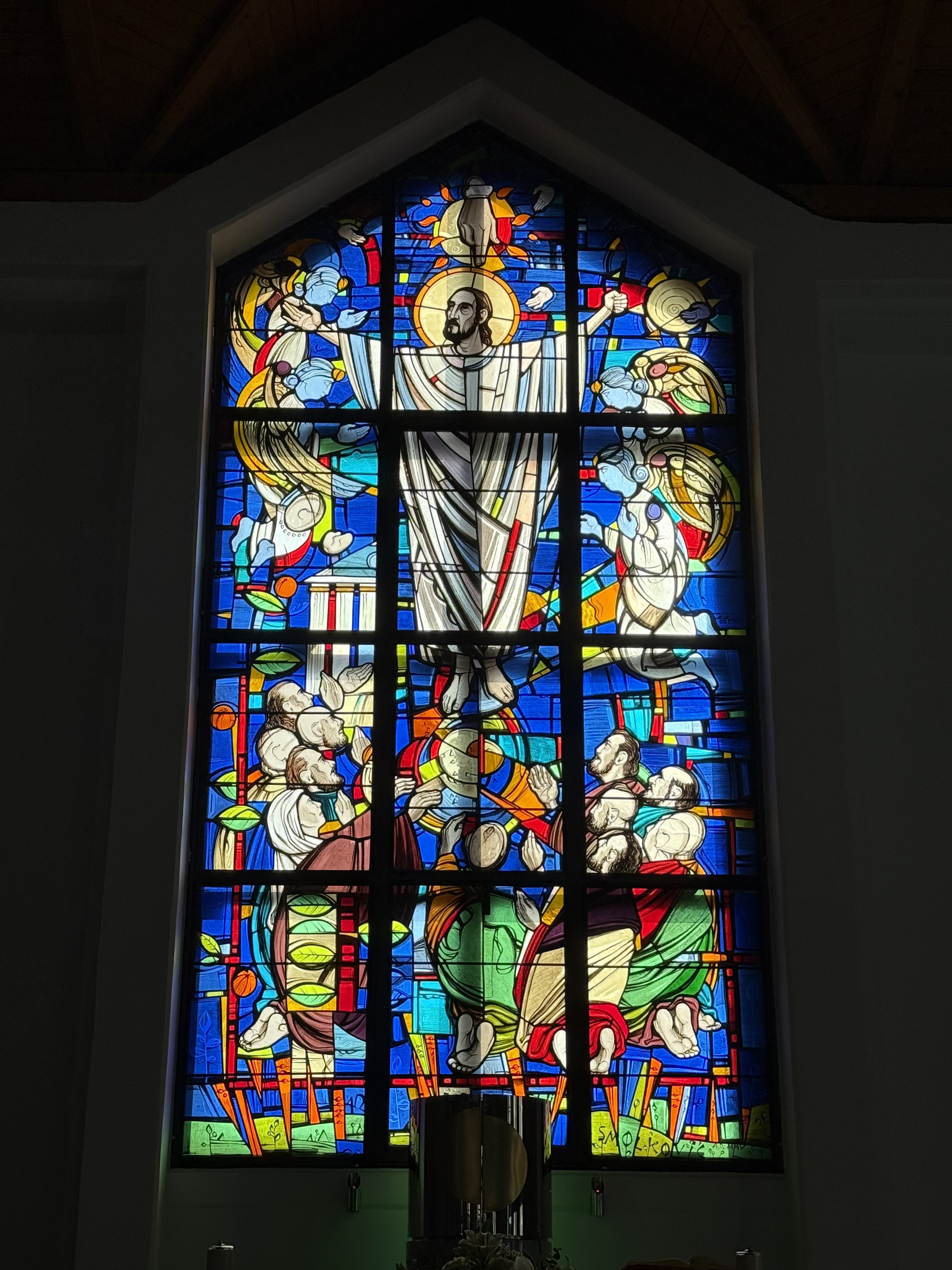
Stained glass above the altar

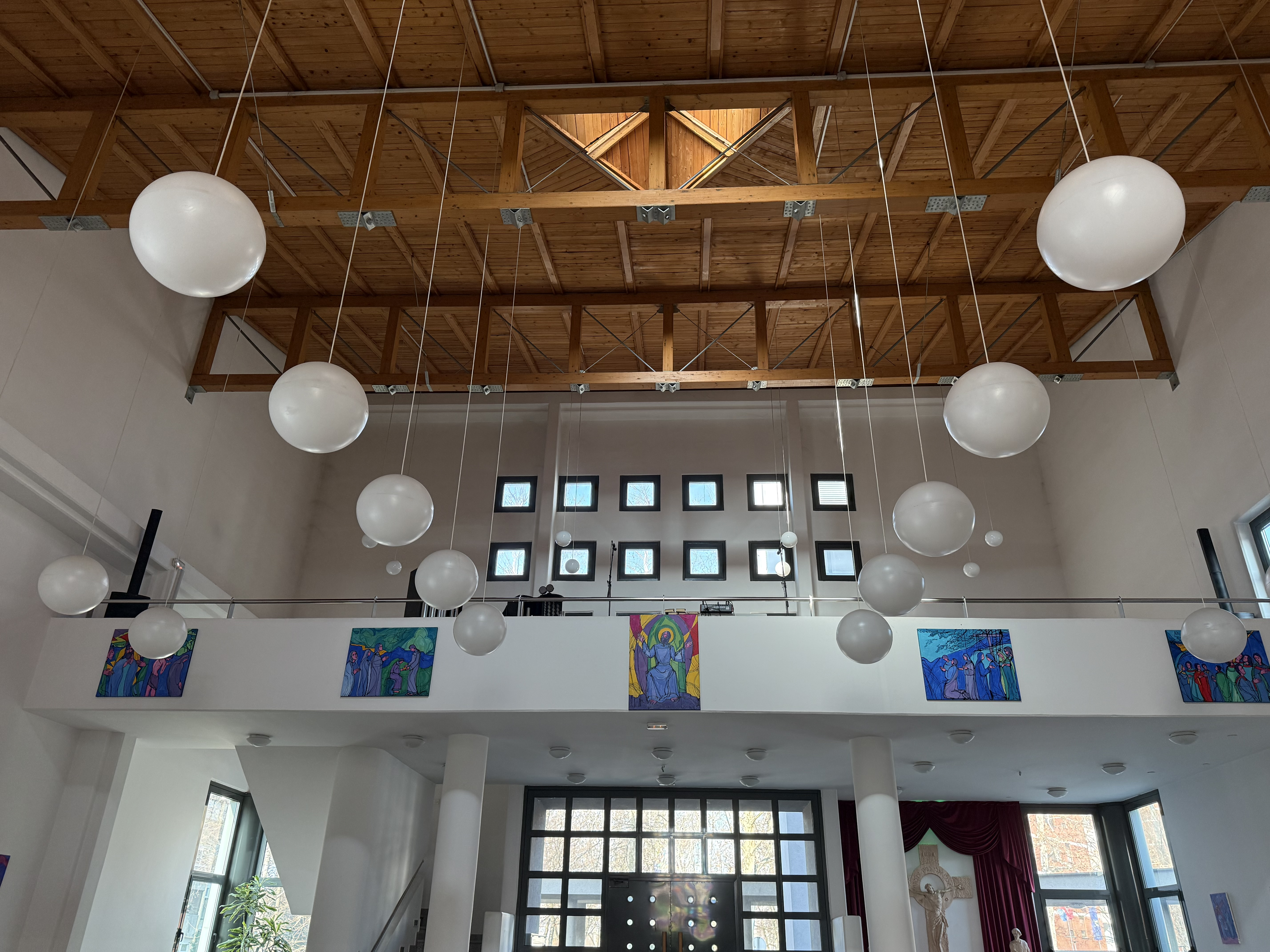
Interior, vault and choir

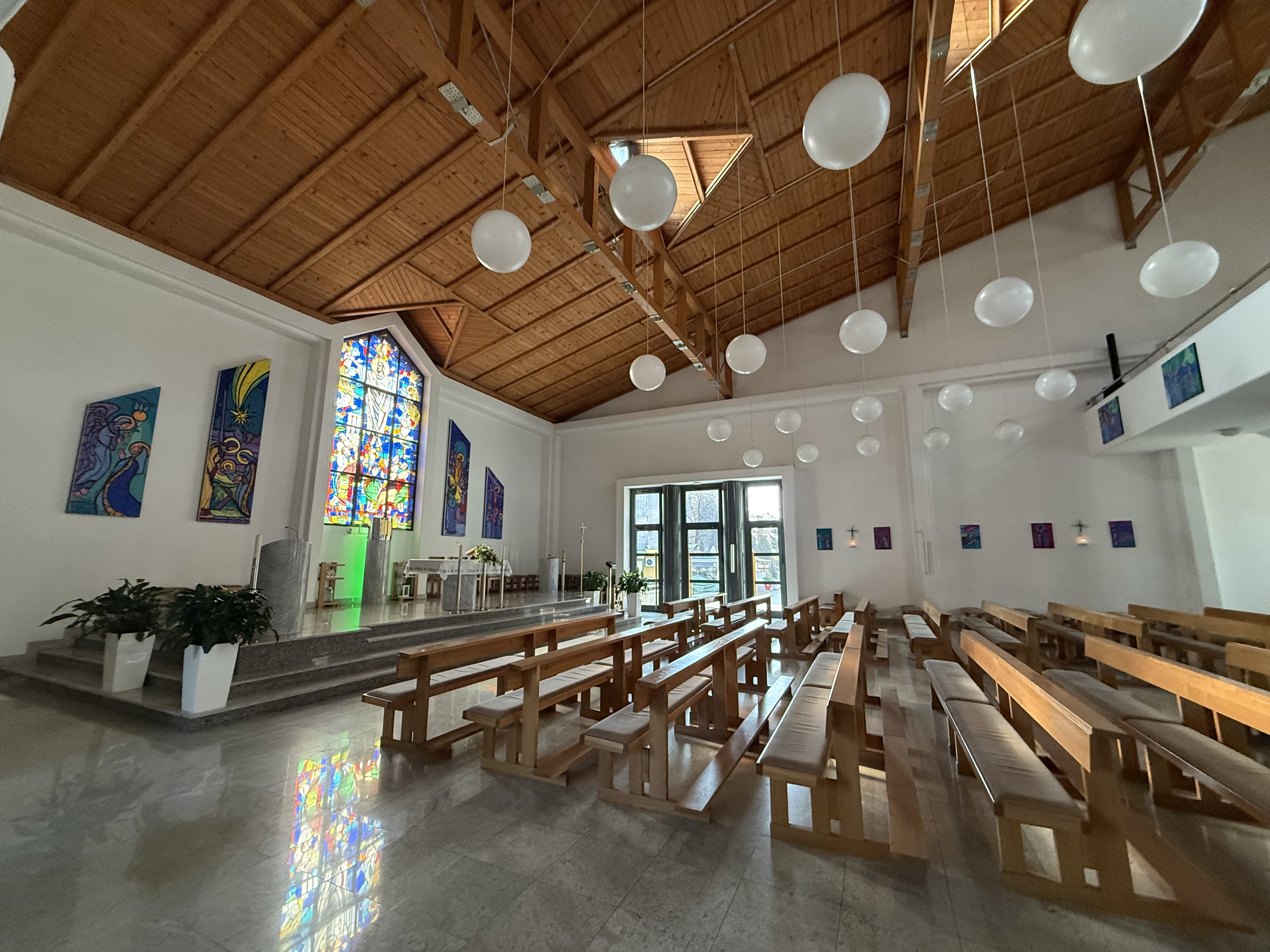
Interior of the church
