= Church of St. Matthew the Apostle and Evangelist, Zagreb =

Church of St. Matthew the Apostle and Evangelist (Croatian: Župna crkva sv. Mateja apostola i evanđelista)
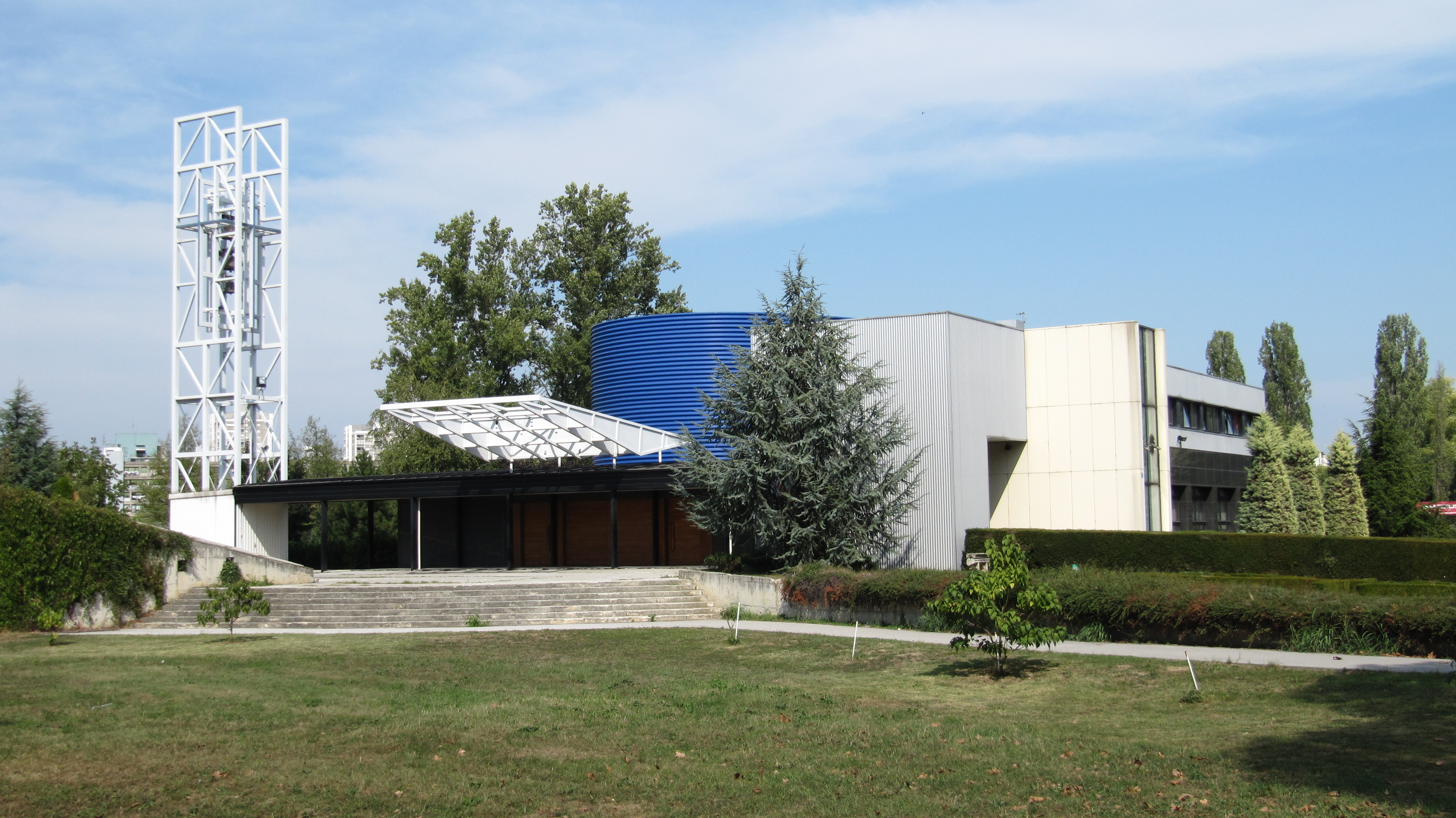
- View of the church
- Church of St. Matthew the Apostle and Evangelist (Croatian: Župna crkva sv. Mateja apostola i evanđelista)
- 45°45′46″N 15°59′56″E
- Location: Zagreb
- Country: Croatia
- Denomination: Roman Catholic

Architecture
- Functional status: Active
- Completed: 1992

Church of St. Matthew the Apostle and Evangelist, Zagreb (Croatian: Župna crkva sv. Mateja apostola i evanđelista u Zagrebu) is a Catholic parish church located in the neighbourhood Dugave of Zagreb, Croatia.

== History ==
It was built in 1991 and 1992, and renovated and furnished over the next few years. In May 2006, it was consecrated by the Archbishop of Zagreb, Cardinal Josip Bozanić.

== Architecture ==
The authors of the project for the construction of this sacral building are architects Vinko Penezić and Krešimir Rogina, and the project was created in 1989. The church is located on a significant road in the settlement. From the perspective of the access road, the volume of the rectory is emphasized, and the volume of the church is indicated only in the background. From the side of the park, a perspective opens up on the church and the bell tower. In front of the church there is an outdoor square, which is partly transformed into an amphitheater stage and is used for organizing liturgical celebrations in the open air. The square is tucked into the depth of the plot and has a very strong private character.

The central space of the church has a longitudinal orientation that ends with the indication of the apse. At the end of the long axis of the ellipse is the presbytery. The space for the faithful is in a gentle amphitheatrical slope towards the sanctuary, and the sanctuary is raised in relation to the space for the faithful. In the center of the sanctuary is the altar, and to the left of it is the ambon. The Tranquility is located to the right in the sanctuary space. To the right of the entrance to the church, there is a baptistery with zenithal lighting.

== Gallery ==
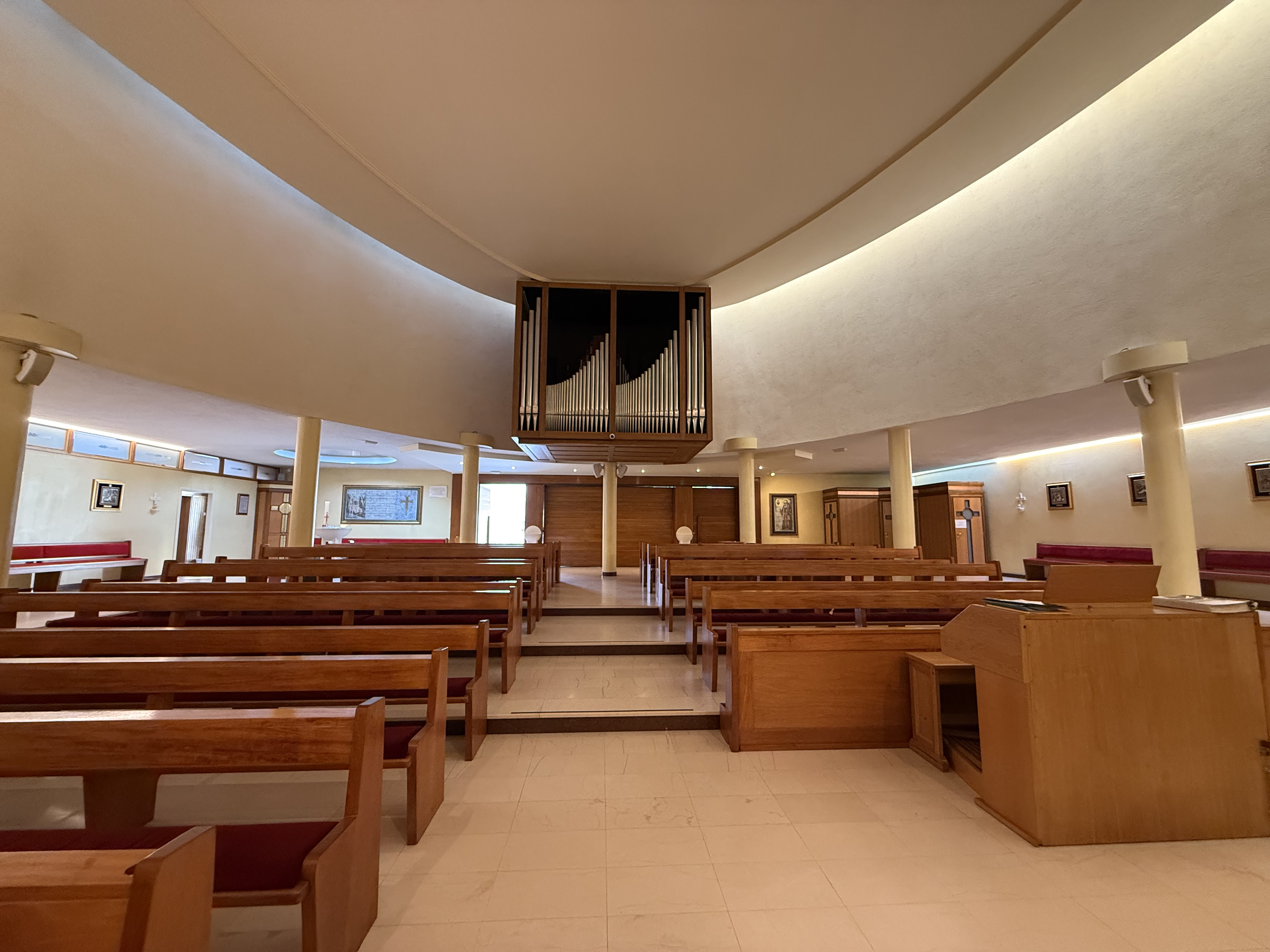
View from the altar; the baptistery is at the bottom left

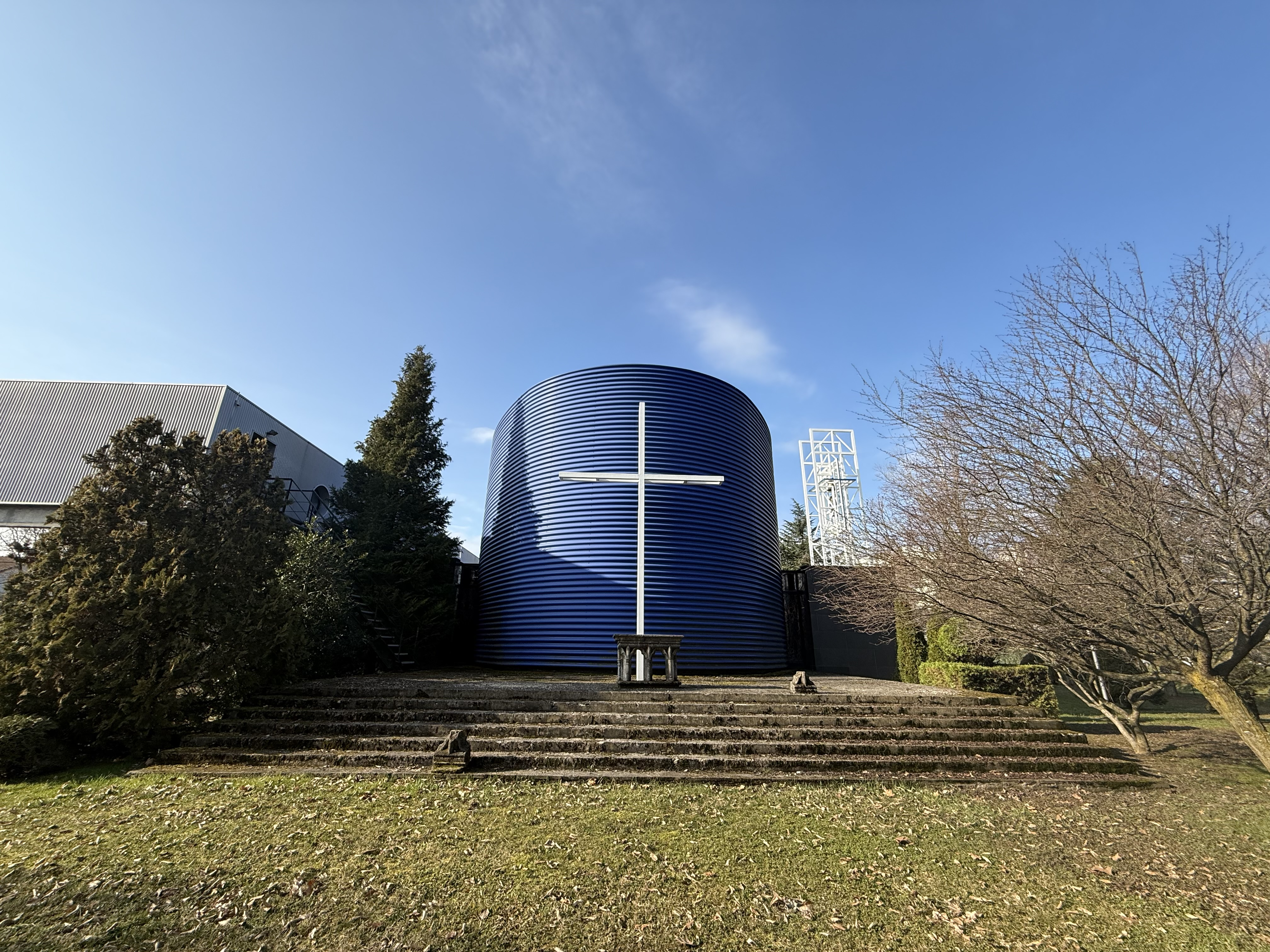
The back of the church

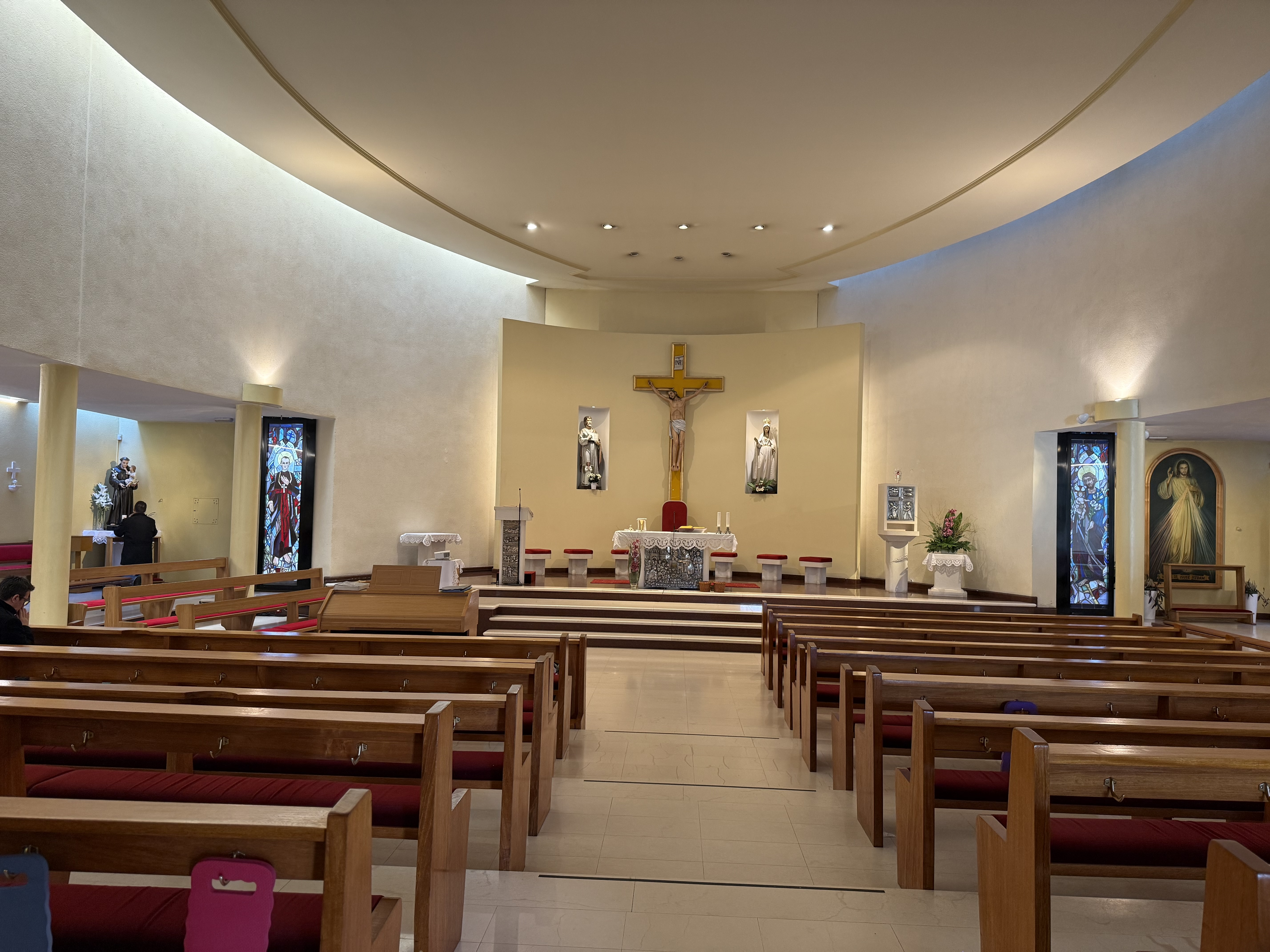
View from the entrance towards the altar

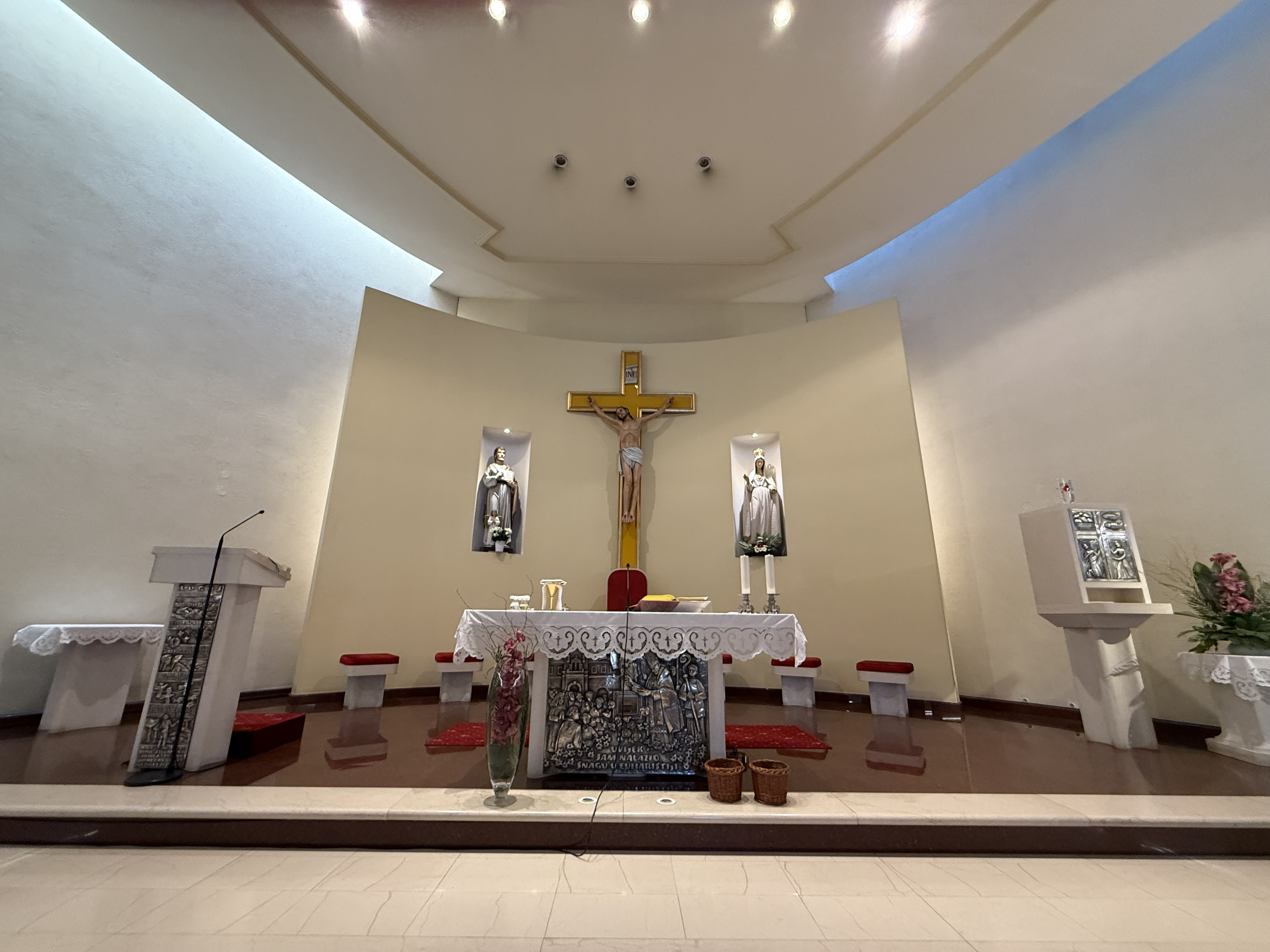
Altar, pulpit and tabernacle

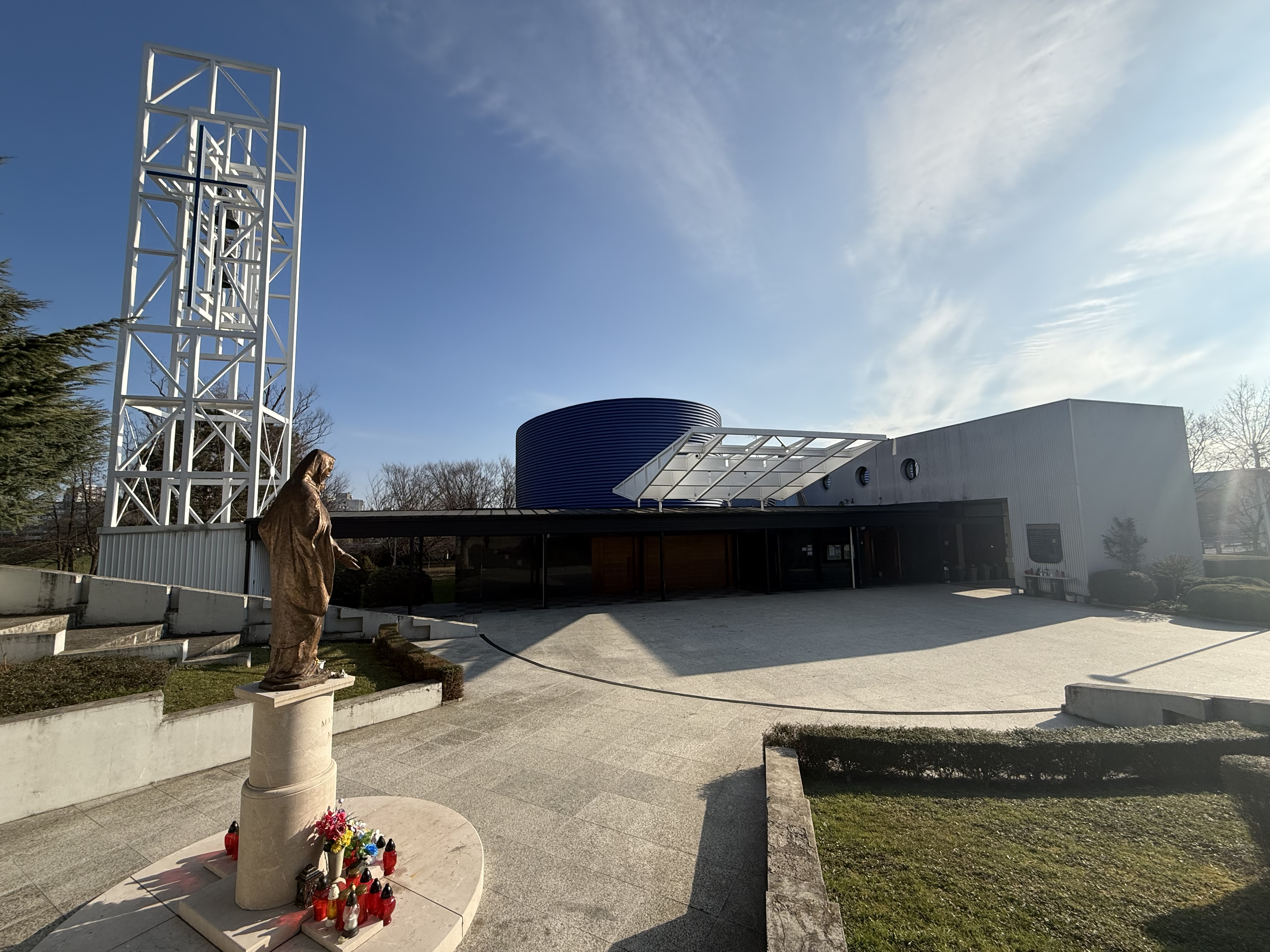
View of the church and bell tower from the square in front of the church

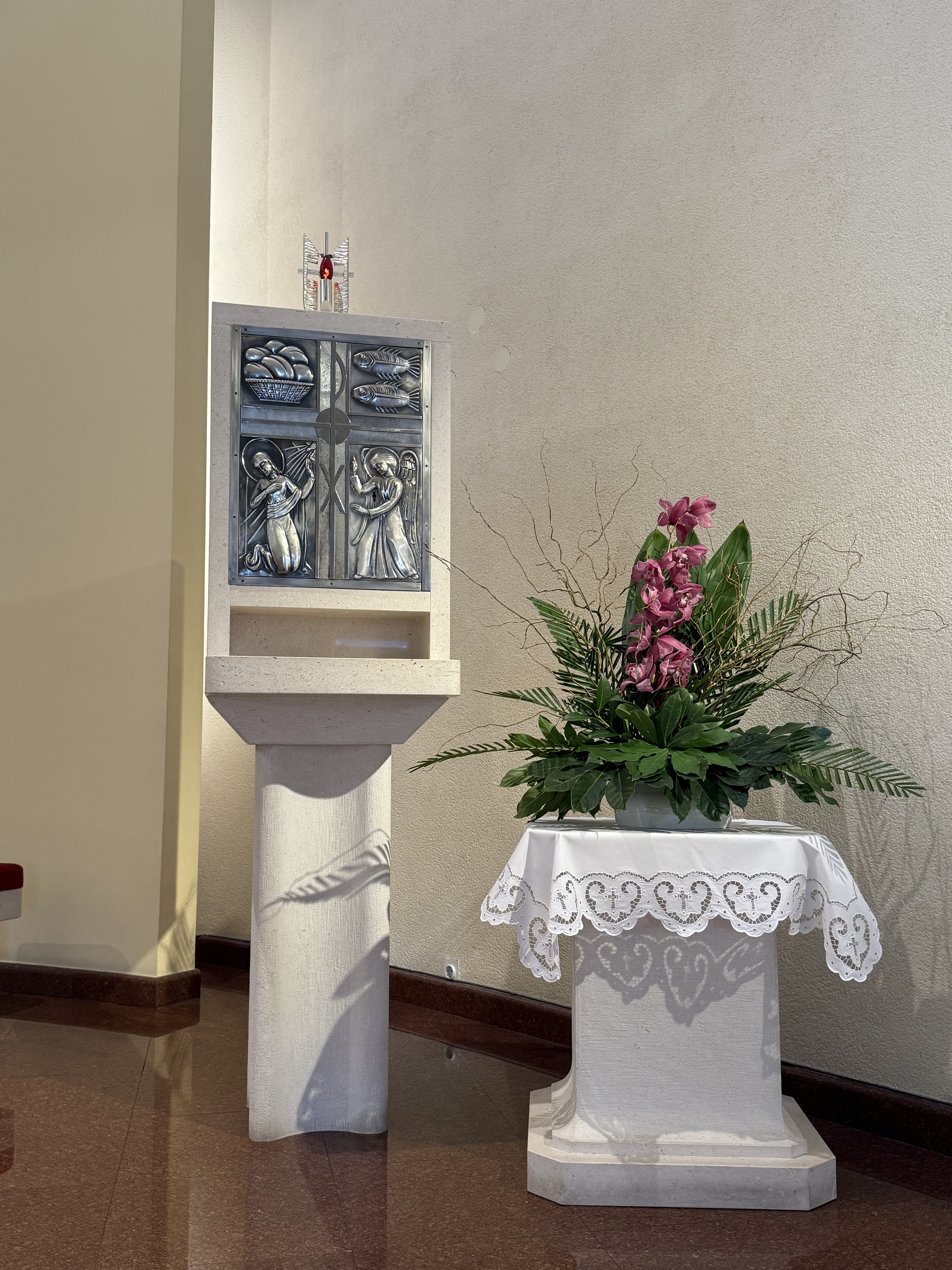
The tabernacle located next to the altar
