= Veliko Polje, Zagreb =

Veliko Polje
- Village
- Location within Croatia
- Coordinates: 45.736762°N 16.016424°E
- Country: Croatia
- County: City of Zagreb
- City District: Novi Zagreb – istok

Area
  - Total: 0.46 sq mi (1.2 km^{2})

Population (2021)
  - Total: 2,122
  - Density: 4,600/sq mi (1,800/km^{2})
- Time zone: UTC+1 (CET)
  - Summer (DST): UTC+2 (CEST)

Veliko Polje is an urban settlement of the Croatian capital of Zagreb, within Novi Zagreb – istok District.

== Demographics ==
According to the 2021 census, its population was 2,122. The population was 1,668 in 2011.
