= Novi Zagreb – istok =

District in Zagreb, Croatia

Coordinates: 45°46′25.55″N 15°59′27.40″E

- District of Zagreb
- Novi Zagreb-istok as a part of Zagreb
- Country: Croatia
- County/City: Zagreb

Government
  - Council President: Darko Konjiković (M!-SDP)
  - District Council: Composition (19): M!-SDP (13); HDZ-DP-HSU-HSS (3); Marija Selak Raspudić list (2); Davor Bernardić list (1)

Area
  - Total: 16.543 km^{2} (6.387 sq mi)

Population (2021)
  - Total: 55,898
  - Density: 3,379.0/km^{2} (8,751.4/sq mi)

Map

Novi Zagreb – istok (Croatian pronunciation: [nôʋiː zǎːgreb ǐstok], "New Zagreb – east") is a district in Zagreb, Croatia.

In the north of Novi Zagreb, just south of the river Sava, is lake Bundek. Though originally a gravel pit, the area was redesigned as an urban park with recreational and sports facilities in the early 2000s.

Novi Zagreb-istok has the status of a city district (gradska četvrt) and as such has an elected council.

Novi Zagreb-istok had 59,055 residents at the 2011 census.

== Neighborhoods in Novi Zagreb-istok ==
- Dugave can be reached by bus, lines 109 (western side of Zagreb) and 220 (center of Zagreb). It is the biggest neighbourhood in Novi Zagreb.
- Hrelić
- Jakuševec
- Sloboština can be reached by bus line number 219.
- Sopot is amongst the tower blocks of flats. The tram routes for the No 7 and 14 trams run along its northern edge, and the No 6 tram has its turning point there.
- Središće
- Travno can be reached by bus line number 221. Mamutica is located in this neighbourhood.
- Utrine contains one of the largest markets in Zagreb. Though it is a covered market, it is in the tradition of open markets with stallholders selling fruit, vegetables and flowers.
- Zapruđe
- Buzin
- Veliko Polje

== See also ==
- Novi Zagreb
