= Utrina =

Neighbourhood of Zagreb, Croatia

Coordinates: 45°46′32″N 15°59′50″E

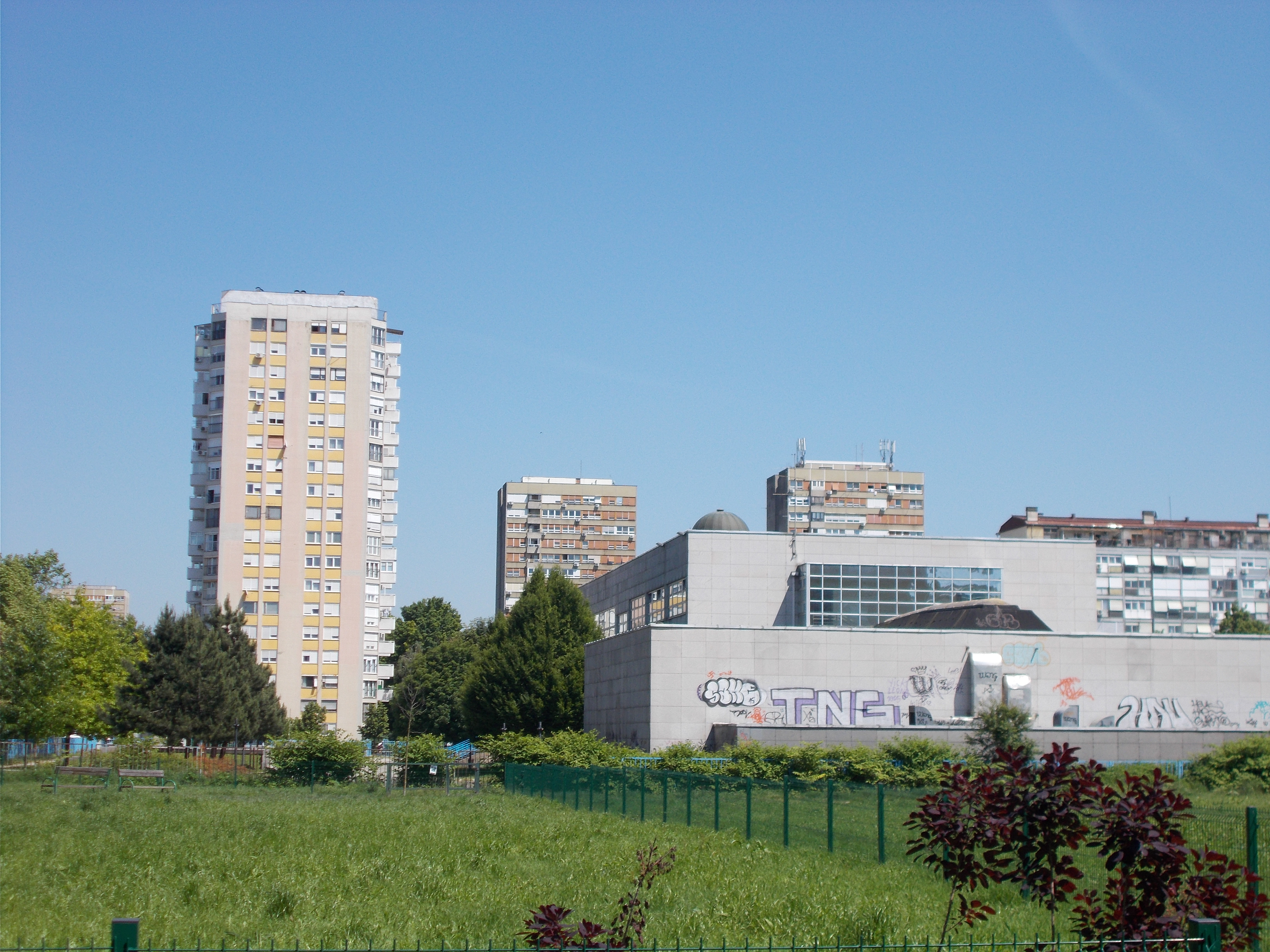
Utrine pool complex was opened in 2004

Utrina (colloquially Utrine) is a residential neighborhood located in the Novi Zagreb - istok (New Zagreb - east) district of Zagreb, Croatia. It is bordered by Avenija Dubrovnik (Dubrovnik Avenue) on the north side, Ulica Savezne Republike Njemačke (Federal Republic of Germany Street) on the west side, Ukrajinska ulica (Ukraine street) on the south side, and Sarajevska cesta (Sarajevo road) on the east side. It has a population of 7,749 (2011).

It is best known for its farmers' market. The neighborhood is also the site of the largest dog park in Zagreb, opened in 2012.

Utrina is served by ZET tram lines 6, 7, 8, 14 and 31, bus line 222, from the northern side; bus line 221 from the southern side; and bus lines 109, 219, 220, 229 and the Pleso Prijevoz Airport Shuttle bus from the west side.
