= Zapruđe =

Neighbourhood of Zagreb, Croatia

Coordinates: 45.77945°N 15.99651°E

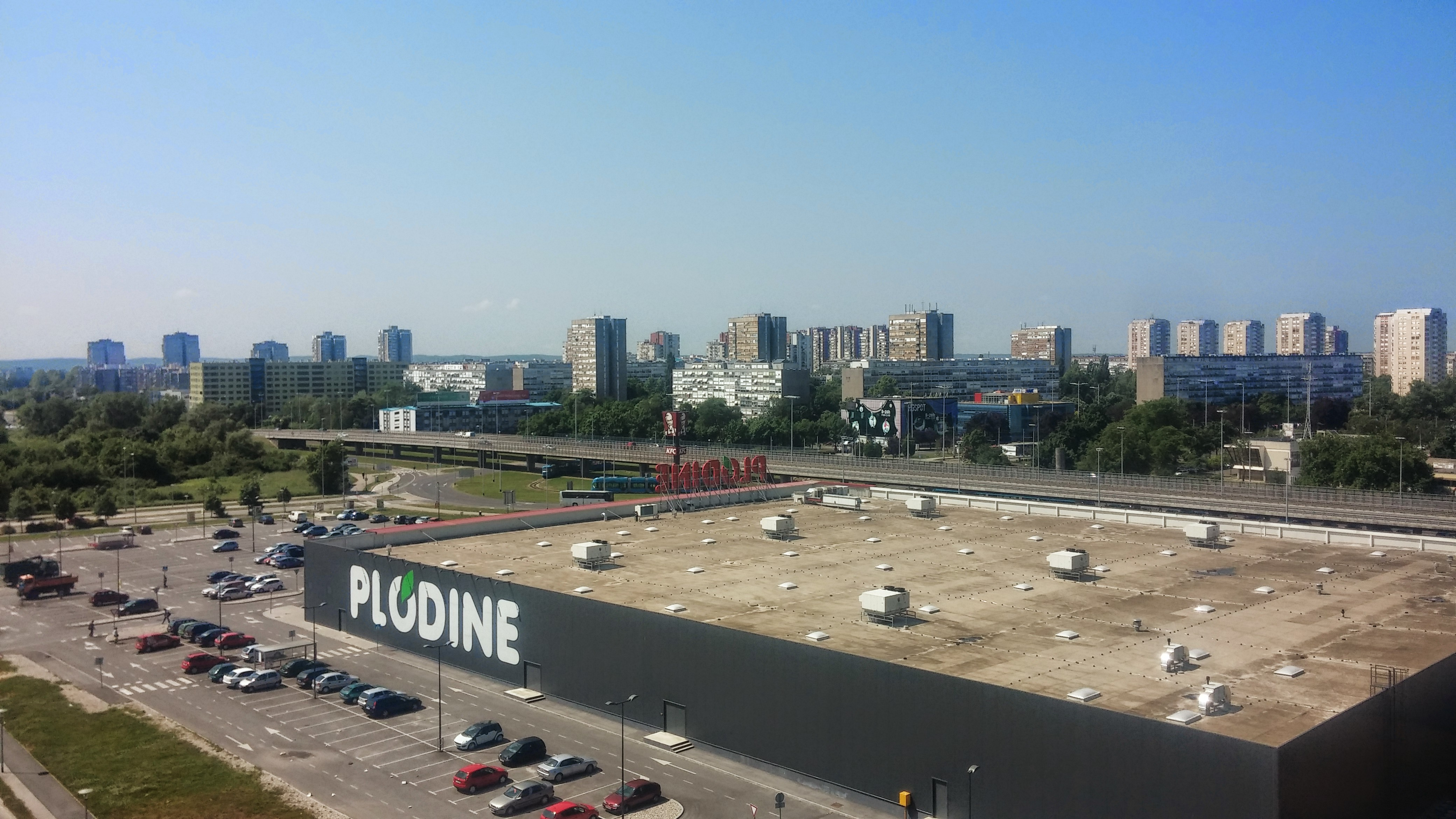
- Panoramic view of Zapruđe
- Interactive map of Zapruđe

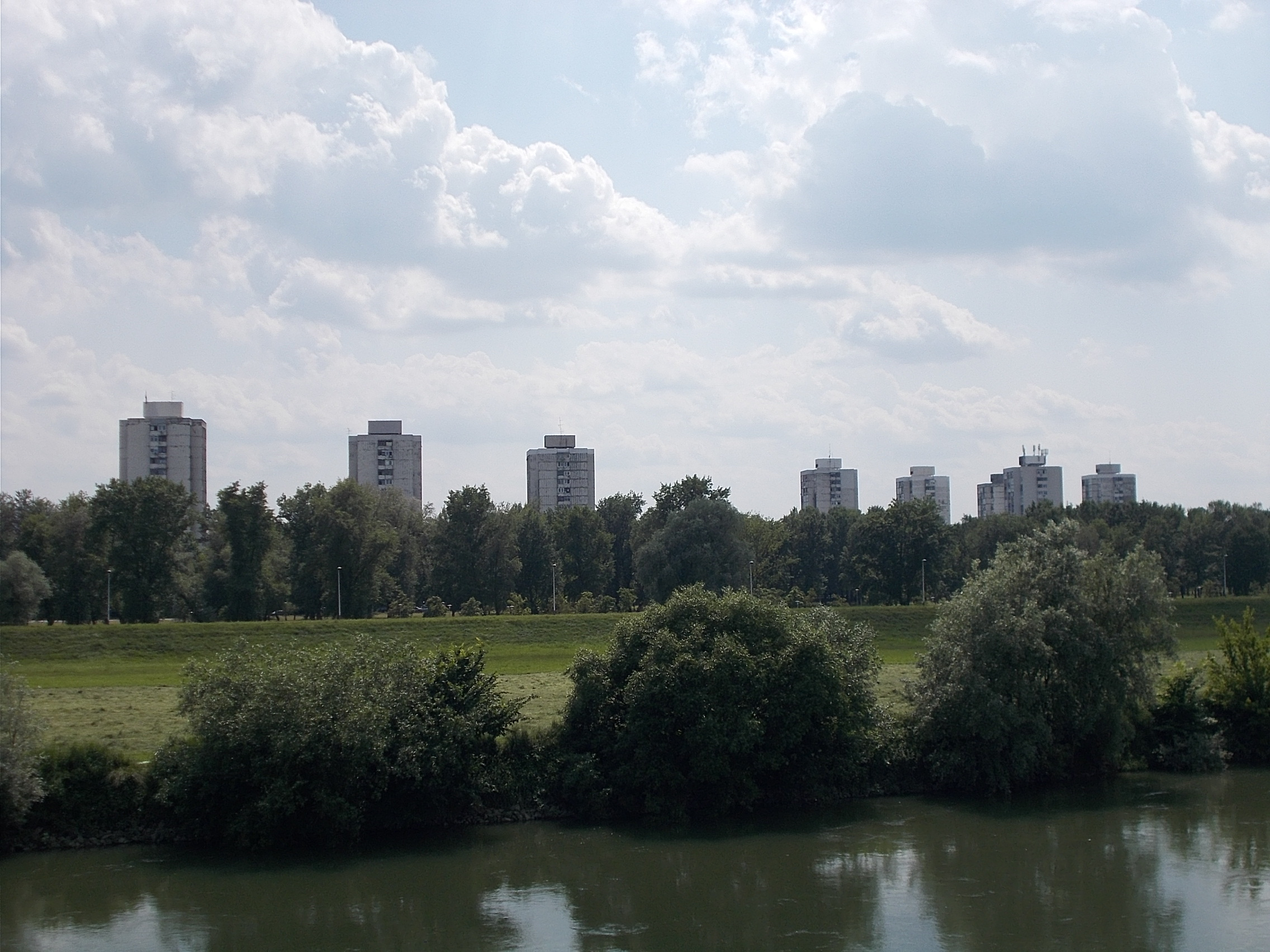
Buildings in Zapruđe, Novi Zagreb

Zapruđe is a neighbourhood in Zagreb, in the Novi Zagreb East District just south of Sava River near the Youth Bridge. The Zapruđe local committee had a population of 6,184 at the 2011 census.

As of 2012, the district consists mostly of residential high-rises, but it also has several chain stores, a butcher, a post office, a bank, a school, a kindergarten, a library, a community hall, a health center, and a pharmacy.

It has its own festivals and traditions, such as the Zapruđe Festival, and a soccer team, NK Zapruđe.

The neighborhood can be accessed via the Zagreb Tramway routes 6, 7, 8, and 14, and bus routes 109, 219, 220, 222, 229, and the Pleso Prijevoz airport shuttle.

Borders:

- North: Damir Tomljanović Street
- South: Dubrovnik Avenue
- West: Savezna Republika Njemačka Street
- East: Sarajevska Road

== History ==
Mayor Većeslav Holjevac held office from 1952 to 1963, during which a bridge was constructed over the Sava River and the city expanded southward to New Zagreb. Following the construction of the 1960 Liberty Bridge, the district's population rapidly grew in the following couple of decades.
