= Dugave =

Neighbourhood of Zagreb, Croatia

- Urban settlement of Zagreb
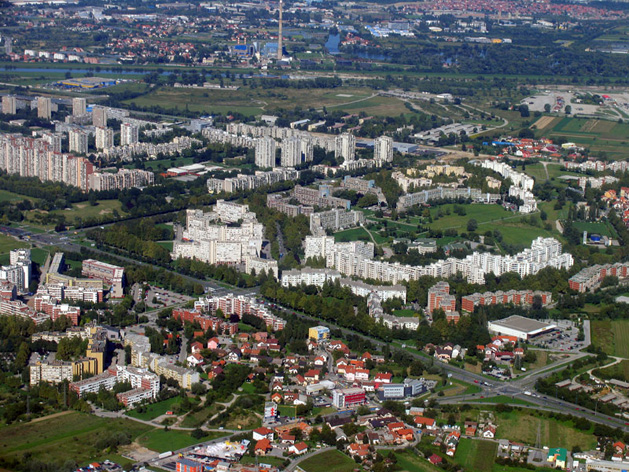
- Dugave seen from above, as well as Sloboština (lower left), and Travno (upper left)
- Interactive map of Dugave
- Coordinates: 45°45′52.1″N 16°0′7.5″E
- Country: Croatia
- City: Zagreb
- City district: Novi Zagreb – istok

Area
  - Total: 0.8502 km^{2} (0.3283 sq mi)

Population (2011)
  - Total: 10,492
  - Density: 12,340/km^{2} (31,960/sq mi)

Dugave is an urban settlement of the Croatian capital of Zagreb, within Novi Zagreb – istok District. Its neighbors are Travno, Sloboština and Hrelić, making Dugave the center of its district. The quarter itself has over 10,000 residents. It is the southernmost neighborhood in Novi Zagreb. The neighborhood is known for having a luxurious part known as the "Beverly Hills of Dugave".

== History ==
The assembly of the Novi Zagreb municipality made a decision in 1975 about the implementation of the urban neighborhood, and the first award for an ideal solution was given to Ivan Čižmek, Tomislav Odak, Tomislav Bilić and Zdenko Vazdar.

The setting stone for the commencement of the building of the new neighborhood in Zagreb was set on 25 May 1977. During its designing, the orthogonal way that some of the older neighborhoods in the city were built in was abolished.

== Arrangement ==
The neighborhood has green areas, including parks and playgrounds. Local facilities include a church, a school, a kindergarten, a soccer club and a library.

The dried out branch of the Sava river, Savišće, crosses through the neighborhood north-south.

The neighborhood is also the home of largest crest of GNK Dinamo Zagreb which is located next to the school.

== Education ==
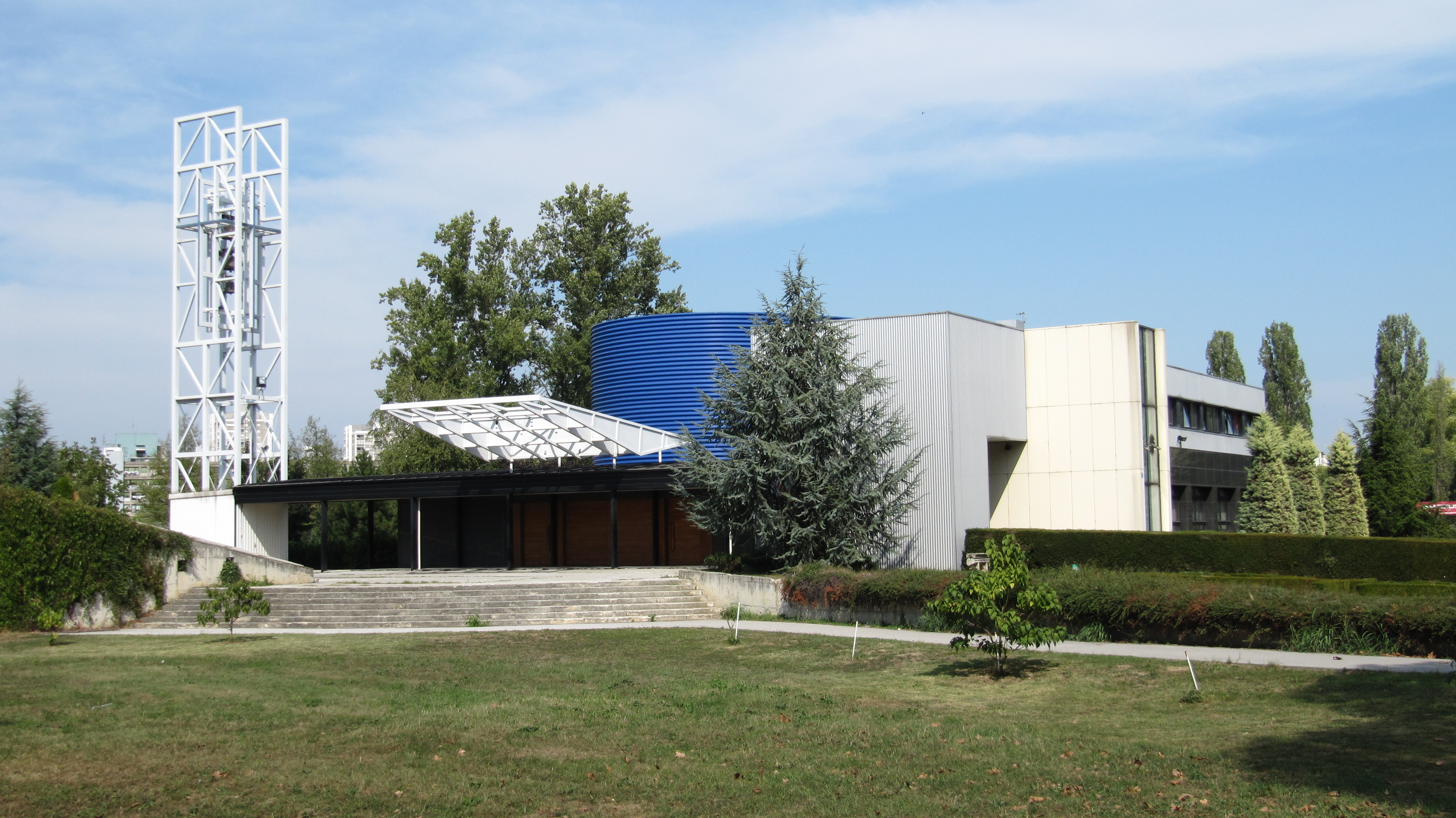
St. Matthew's church in Dugave

Dugave has its own kindergarten, Vrtić Tratinčica (eng. Kindergarten Daisy), which consists of a main building near the center of the neighborhood and more buildings around Dugave. The kindergarten was founded in 1980.

The primary school in Dugave was built in 1980 also, bearing the name OŠ Josip Kraš (eng. Josip Kraš Primary School). Due to the demographic boom, it became one of the biggest primary schools in former Yugoslavia with 2648 students. Thus, in 1991, the school was divided into two schools: I. OŠ Dugave and II. OŠ Dugave (eng. Dugave Primary School 1 and Dugave Primary School 2). II. OŠ Dugave was later renamed into OŠ Fran Galović (eng. Fran Galović Primary School). The two schools worked together in the same building, functioning in two shifts, up until 2025, when OŠ Fran Galović moved to a new building in neighboring Jakuševec. The old school building in Dugave has a peculiar shape consisting of three hexagonal-looking buildings, adjoined by an annex and a special building where the gyms and the locker rooms are. There are five fields behind the school: two for soccer and three for basketball. I. OŠ Dugave is a high quality primary school known for hardworking and intelligent students who excel in Math, Geography and Physics (courtesy of the late Pavo Majić). The school paper, Dugi, which stopped being published in the year 2009, got many critical acclaims and rewards, as well as the school's drama group. The school has been on TV many times; in 2008, one of the students of the 2nd grade won the televised learning competition Učilica for the first time in the year, and in 2013 the school was once again visited by a local TV company which presented it. A game of basketball was played between the two schools, with I. OŠ Dugave winning.

== Public transport ==
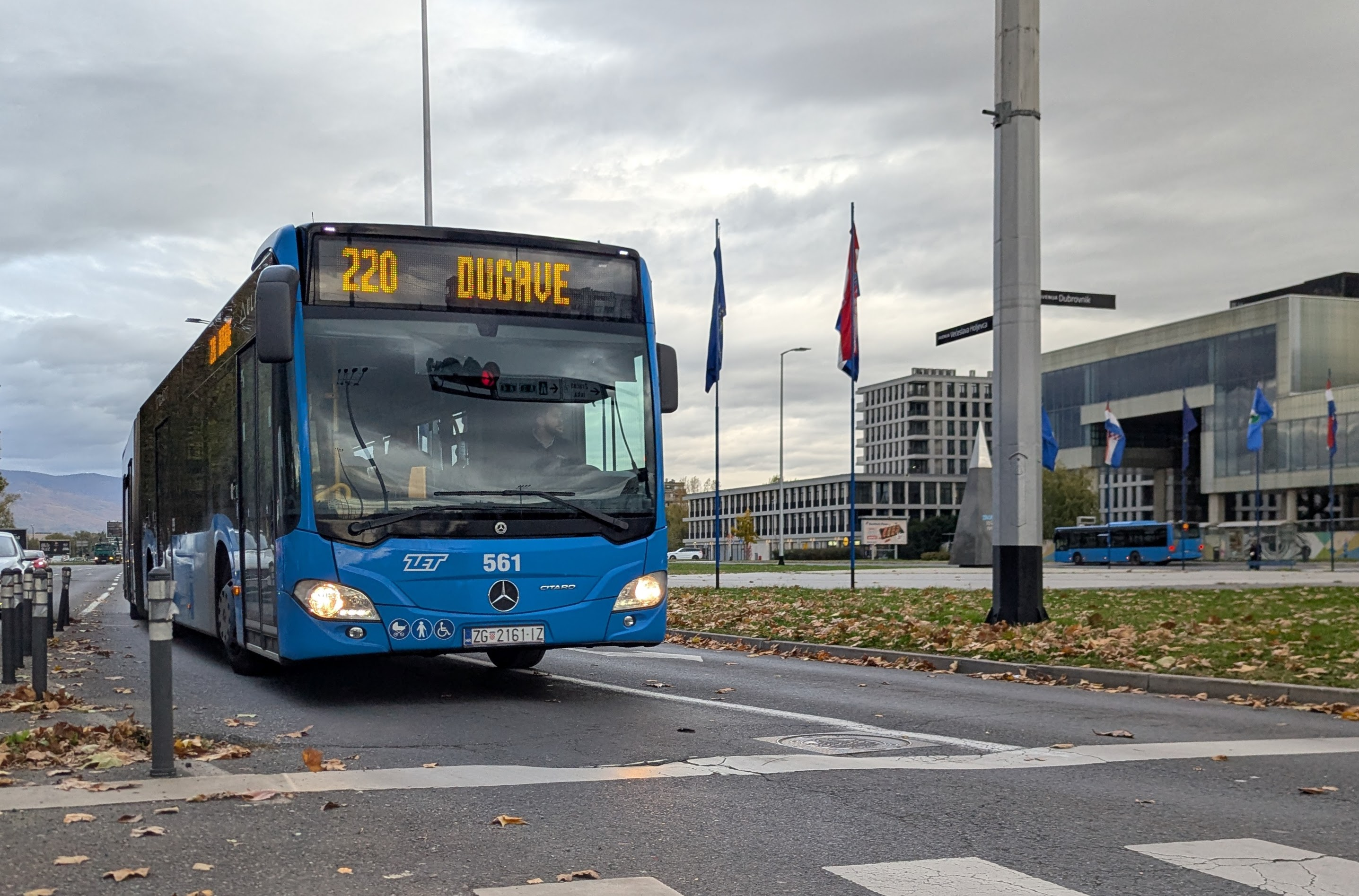
ZET Citaro G Articulated Bus on line 220 to Dugave

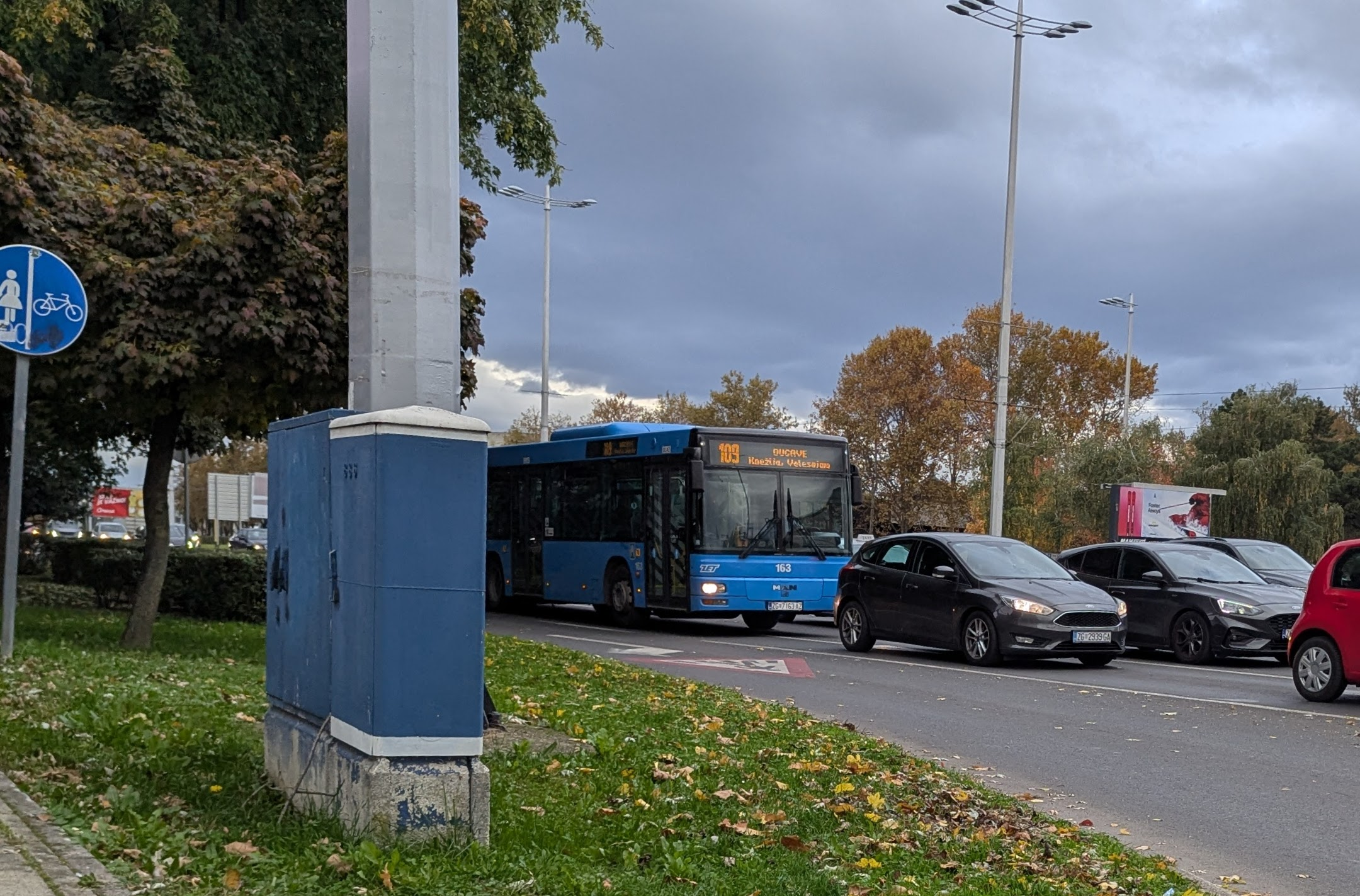
ZET Man Articulated Bus on line 109 to Dugave

There are 2 lines operated by ZET that end/start in Dugave.

- 109 (Črnomerec – Dugave)
- 220 (Glavni kolodvor – Dugave)
