= St. John the Evangelist Church =

St. John the Evangelist Church refers to churches honoring John the Apostle, also known as John the Divine or John of Patmos, as their patron saint, as distinguished from John the Baptist, whose namesakes are known as Saint John the Baptist Church. Thus, the designation may refer to:

== Australia ==
- St John the Evangelist Church, Wallerawang, New South Wales
- St John the Evangelist Church, Wollombi, New South Wales
- St John the Evangelist Anglican Church, Stroud, New South Wales
- 420 Kent Street, also known as St. John the Evangelist Church, Sydney, New South Wales
- St John's Cathedral, Brisbane, Queensland
- St John's Anglican Church, Albany, Western Australia
- St John's Anglican Church, Fremantle, Western Australia
- St John's the Evangelist Church, Greenwood, Greenwood, Western Australia

== Canada ==
- Anglican Church of St. John the Evangelist (Ottawa)
- Church of St. John the Evangelist (Montreal)
- St. John the Evangelist Anglican Church (Foam Lake)
- St. John the Evangelist Anglican Church (Peterborough, Ontario)
- Church of St. John the Evangelist (Toronto)

== China ==
- St John's Church, Chengdu

== Hong Kong ==
- St. John's Cathedral, Hong Kong, The Cathedral Church of St. John the Evangelist

== India ==
- Afghan Church, the Church of St John the Evangelist, South Mumbai
- Malankara Orthodox Church, St. John's Orthodox Church Syrian Church, Thuvayoor, Kerala(Dedicated in the name of St. John the Evangelist)

== Ireland ==
- Church of St. John the Evangelist, Dublin

== Italy ==
- San Giovanni in Monte, Bologna
- San Giovanni Evangelista, Parma
- San Giovanni Evangelista, Ravenna

== Malta ==
- St John's Chapel, Ħal Millieri

== New Zealand ==
- Church of St John the Evangelist, Westport

== Poland ==
- St. John's Evangelist Church (Pińczów)

== Russia ==
- St. John the Evangelist Church (Grushevskaya)

== United Kingdom ==
=== England ===
- St John the Evangelist Church, Banbury, Oxfordshire
- St John's Church, Bath (St. John the Evangelist R.C. Church)
- St John's Church, Blackpool (Church of Saint John the Evangelist)
- St John the Evangelist Church, Brentford
- The chapel of St John's College, Cambridge and numerous other similar chapels
- Church of St. John the Evangelist, Carrington
- Church of St John the Evangelist, Havering-atte-Bower
- St John the Evangelist Church, Heron's Ghyll, East Sussex
- Church of St. John the Evangelist, Hucknall
- St John the Evangelist Church, Islington, London
- St John the Divine, Kennington, London
- St. John's Church, Ladywood (The Church of St. John the Evangelist and St. Peter)
- Church of St John the Evangelist, Milborne Port
- St John the Evangelist Church, Oxford
- St John the Evangelist, Palmers Green, London
- Cathedral of St John the Evangelist, Portsmouth
- Church of St John the Evangelist, Poulton-le-Fylde
- St John the Divine, Richmond, London
- St John The Evangelist Church, Ridgeway
- Salford Cathedral, the Cathedral Church of St. John the Evangelist, Salford
- Church of St. John the Evangelist, Sandown, Isle of Wight
- St John the Evangelist, Upper Norwood, London
- Church of St John the Evangelist, Warminster, Wiltshire
- St John the Evangelist Church, Woodley
- Church of St John the Evangelist, Wotton, Surrey

=== Scotland ===
- Church of St John the Evangelist, Aberdeen
- Church of St John the Evangelist, Edinburgh

=== Wales ===
- Brecon Cathedral - Cathedral Church of St John the Evangelist

== United States ==
=== California ===
- Episcopal Church of St. John the Evangelist, San Francisco

=== Indiana ===
- St. John the Evangelist Catholic Church (Indianapolis), on the National Register of Historic Places

=== Massachusetts ===
- St. John the Evangelist Church (Cambridge, Massachusetts)
- St. John the Evangelist Roman Catholic Church (Hopkinton)

=== Maryland ===
- St. John the Evangelist Roman Catholic Church (Baltimore, Maryland), on the National Register of Historic Places
- St. John the Evangelist Catholic Church (Silver Spring, Maryland)
- St. John the Evangelist Catholic Church (Frederick, Maryland)

=== Michigan ===
- St. John the Evangelist Catholic Church (Ishpeming, Michigan)

=== Minnesota ===
- St. John the Evangelist (Rochester, Minnesota)

=== New York ===
- Cathedral of St. John the Divine (New York City)
- St. John the Evangelist Church (Manhattan)
- Church of St. John the Evangelist (Hunter, New York)
- Church of St. John the Evangelist (Stockport, New York) (NRHP)

=== Ohio ===
- Cathedral of St. John the Evangelist (Cleveland, Ohio)
- Saint John the Evangelist Church (Columbus, Ohio)

=== Oregon ===
- St. John the Evangelist Roman Catholic Church (Zigzag, Oregon) (NRHP)

== See also ==
- St John the Evangelist's Church (disambiguation)
- Saint John the Baptist Church (disambiguation)
