= St John the Evangelist's Church =

St John the Evangelist's Church may refer to:

== United Kingdom ==
- St John the Evangelist's Church, Abram, an active Anglican church
- St John the Evangelist's Church, Alvanley, an active Anglican church
- St John the Evangelist's Church, Ashton Hayes, an active Anglican church
- St John the Evangelist's Church, Blackheath, an active Anglican church
- St John the Evangelist's Church, Boscombe, Dorset
- St John The Evangelist's Church, Bracebridge Heath, Lincolnshire
- St John the Evangelist's Church, Burgess Hill, an active Anglican church
- St John the Evangelist's Church, Byley, an active Anglican church
- St John the Evangelist's Church, Cadeby, a redundant Anglican church
- St John the Evangelist's Church, Cambridge, an active Anglican church
- St John the Evangelist's Church, Carlton in Lindrick, an active Anglican church
- St John the Evangelist's Church, Chelford, an active Anglican church
- St John the Evangelist's Church, Chichester, a redundant Anglican church
- St John the Evangelist's Church, Clifton, an active Anglican church
- St John the Evangelist's Church, Corby Glen, an active Anglican church
- St John the Evangelist's Church, Cowgill, an active Anglican church
- St John the Evangelist's Church, Crawshawbooth, an active Anglican church
- St John the Evangelist's Church, Crosscanonby, an active Anglican church
- St John the Evangelist's Church, Farnworth, an active Anglican church
- St John the Evangelist's Church, Greenock, an active Anglican church
- St John the Evangelist's Church, Gressingham, an active Anglican church
- St John the Evangelist's Church, Islington, London
- St John the Evangelist's Church, Kingsley, an active Anglican church
- St John the Evangelist's Church, Kirkdale, an active Catholic church
- St John the Evangelist's Church, Kirkham, an active Catholic church
- St John the Evangelist's Church, Lancaster, a redundant Anglican church
- St John the Evangelist's Church, Leeds, a redundant Anglican church
- St John the Evangelist's Church, Mold, a redundant Welsh church
- St John the Evangelist's Church, Newton Arlosh, an active Anglican church
- St John the Evangelist's Church, Norley, an active Anglican church
- St John the Evangelist's Church, Osmotherley, an active Anglican church
- St John the Evangelist's Church, Otterburn, a church built in 1857 by three sisters
- St John the Evangelist's Church, Penge, an active Anglican church
- St John the Evangelist's Church, Preston Village, an active Anglican church
- St John the Evangelist's Church, Sandbach Heath, an active Anglican church
- St John the Evangelist's Church, Sandiway, an active Anglican church
- St John the Evangelist's Church, St Leonards-on-Sea, an active Anglican church
- St John the Evangelist's Church, Toft, an active Anglican church
- St John the Evangelist's Church, Turncroft, a demolished Anglican church
- St John the Evangelist's Church, Warrington, an active Anglican church
- St John the Evangelist's Church, Weston, an active Anglican church
- St John the Evangelist's Church, Winsford, an active Anglican church
- St John the Evangelist's Church, Woodland, an active Anglican church
- St John the Evangelist's Church, Worsthorne, an active Anglican church

== United States ==
- St. John the Evangelist's Church (Manhattan), an active Catholic church
- St. John the Evangelist's Church (Pawling), an active Catholic church

== See also ==
- St. John the Evangelist Church (disambiguation)
