= Church of St John the Evangelist, Westport =

Church of St John the Evangelist
- St John's Anglican Church
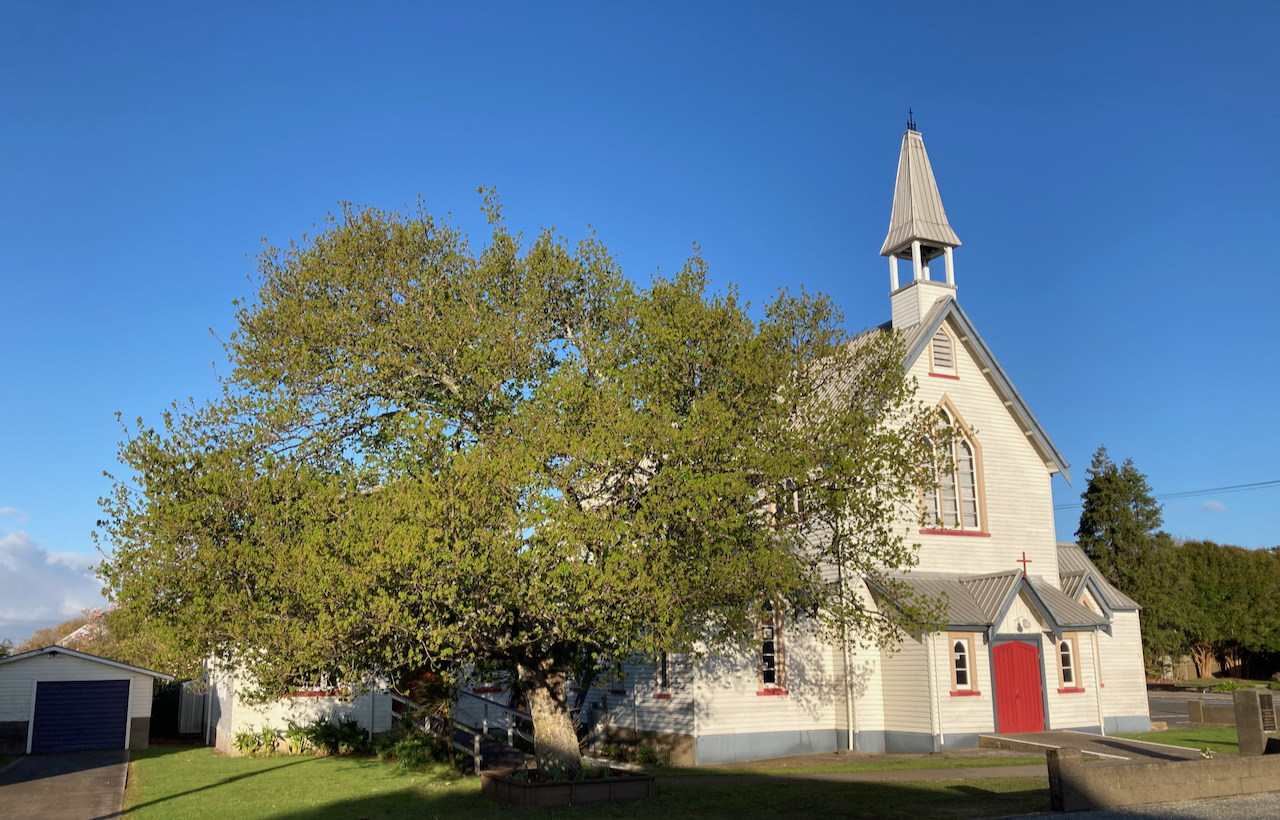
- St John the Evangelist in 2020
- Church of St John the Evangelist
- 41°45′10″S 171°36′5″E
- Location: 67 Queen Street, Westport
- Country: New Zealand
- Denomination: Anglican
- Website: www.churchinwestport.co.nz

History
- Status: Parish church
- Dedication: John the Evangelist
- Consecrated: 1924

Architecture
- Functional status: Active
- Architectural type: Church
- Style: Gothic Revival
- Completed: 1924

Specifications
- Materials: Timber

Administration
- Province: Anglican Church in Aotearoa, New Zealand and Polynesia
- Diocese: Nelson
- Deanery: Mawhera
- Parish: Buller

Heritage New Zealand – Category 2
- Designated: 21 September 1989
- Reference no.: 5027

The Church of St John the Evangelist, also known as St John's Anglican Church, is an heritage-listed Anglican church located in Westport, on the West Coast of the South Island of New Zealand. Completed in 1924, the timber and weatherboard church was listed as a Category 2 Heritage building by Heritage New Zealand in 1989.

== Background ==
The first Church of St John the Evangelist in Westport was consecrated on 28 August 1869 by the Bishop of Nelson, Andrew Suter. However, by 1911, the church was considered to be too small, and plans were drawn up for a replacement church, designed in brick by noted ecclesiastical architect Frederick de Jersey Clere. However, World War I intervened and the scheme did not proceed. Bricks that had been purchased for the construction of the new building were sold in 1923.

== Construction and architecture ==
The present Church of St John the Evangelist was built in 1924 on the site of the previous church. Constructed in timber with weatherboard cladding, the church is designed in a simplified Gothic Revival style with minimal exterior ornament. The building features a steeply pitched gable roof, lancet windows (either singly or in groups of three), and buttresses to provide lateral stability.

== Heritage status ==
On 21 September 1989, the Church of St John the Evangelist was designated as a category 2 historic place by the New Zealand Historic Places Trust. The building remains in use as one of three parish churches within the Buller Anglican Parish.

== See also ==
- Church of St. Luke the Evangelist, Zagreb
