= Travno =

Urban settlement in Zagreb, Croatia

Travno Gradsko naselje Travno
- Urban settlement of Zagreb
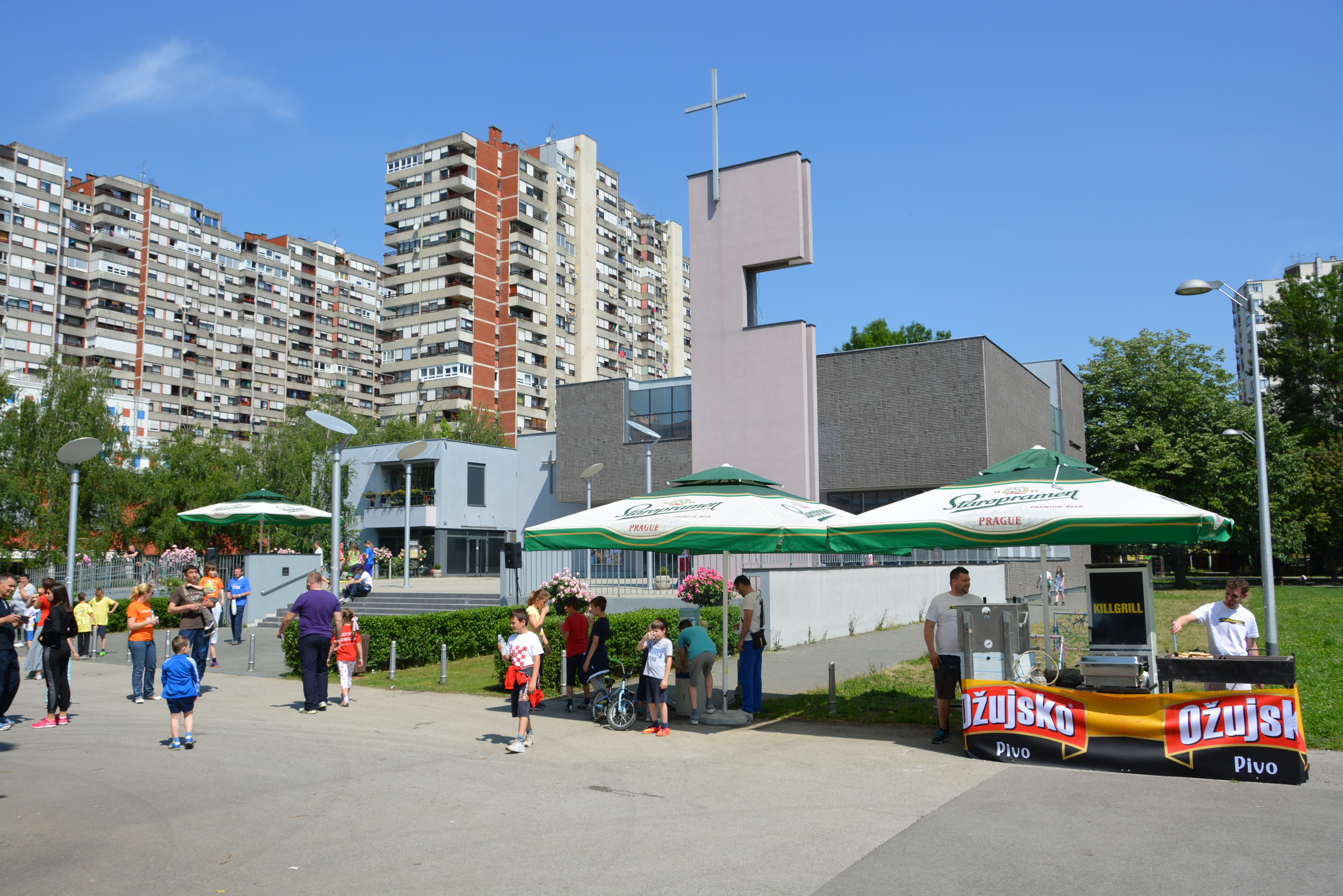
- Church of St. Luke with Mamutica
- Interactive map of Travno
- Coordinates: 45°46′13″N 15°59′51″E
- Country: Croatia
- City: Zagreb
- City district: Novi Zagreb – istok

Area
  - Total: 0.6119 km^{2} (0.2363 sq mi)

Population (2011)
  - Total: 9,960
  - Density: 16,300/km^{2} (42,200/sq mi)

Travno is an urban settlement of the Croatian capital of Zagreb, located in the city district of Novi Zagreb – istok.

It is one of the most densely populated settlements in Croatia mostly due to the largest apartment building in Croatia: Mamutica.

The Gustav Krklec elementary school and a large green area (Travno Park) are located in the center of the settlement. There are two major streets - Božidar Magovac (former Victor Bubanj Alley) and Nikola Kopernik, and three kindergartens. Also, it has the Catholic Church of St. Luke the Evangelist.

The Travno Cultural Center and the City Library - Novi Zagreb are located in Travno.

== Gallery ==
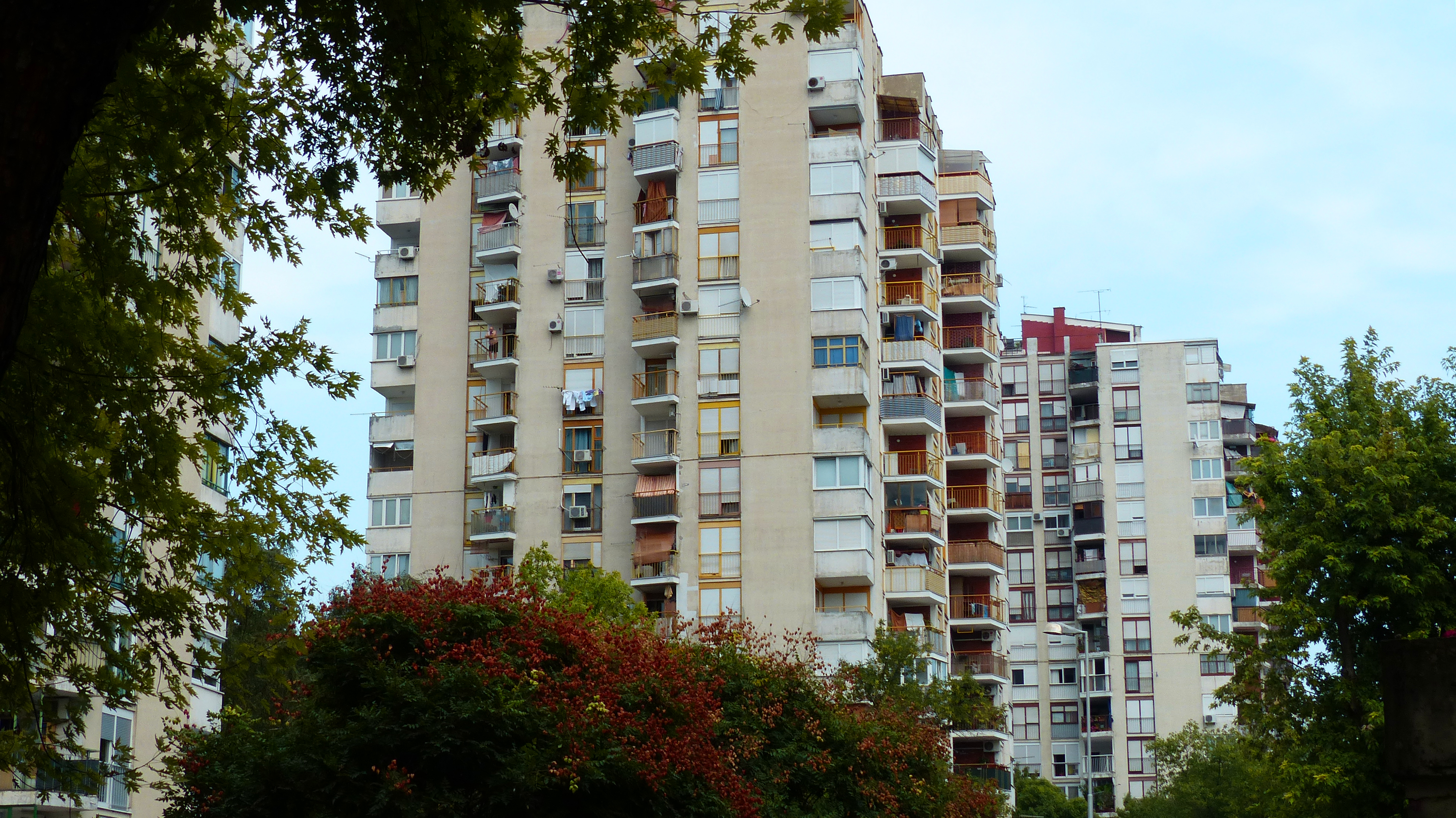
Skyscrapers in settlement Travno in Kopernikova street

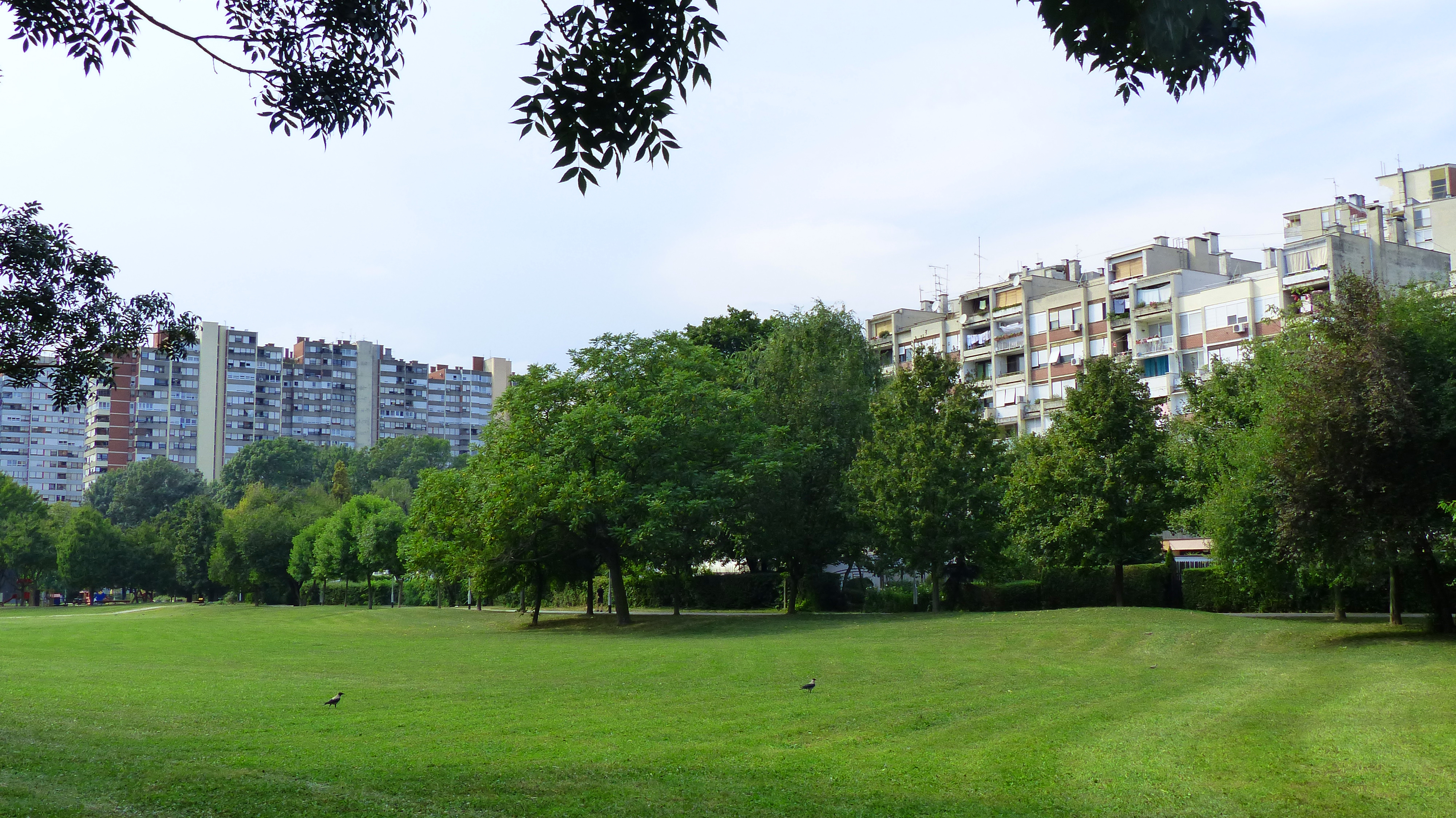
Large green area in the center of settlement Travno - Park Travno in Zagreb

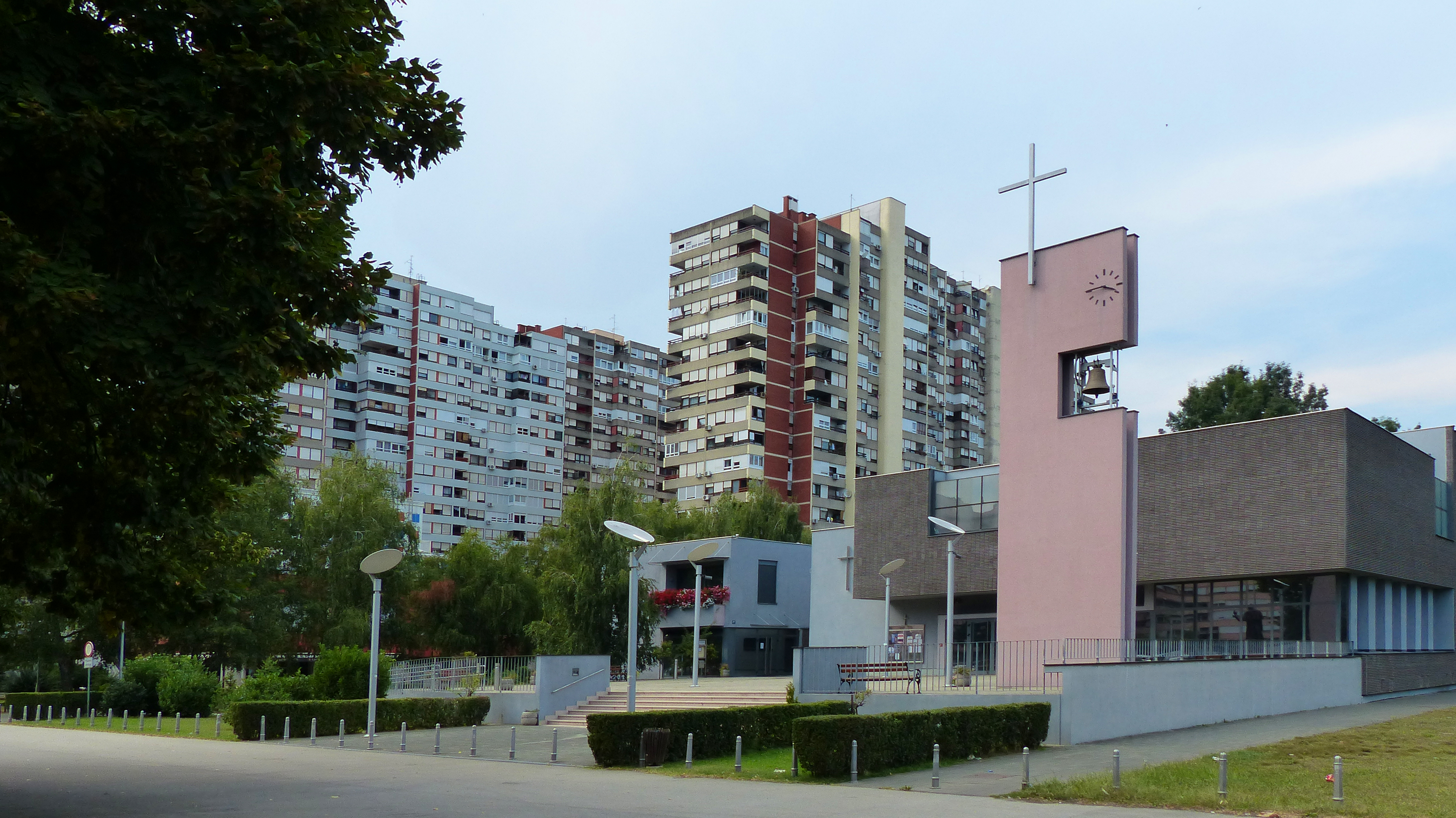
Parish Church of St Luke the Evangelist in settlement Travno in Novi Zagreb

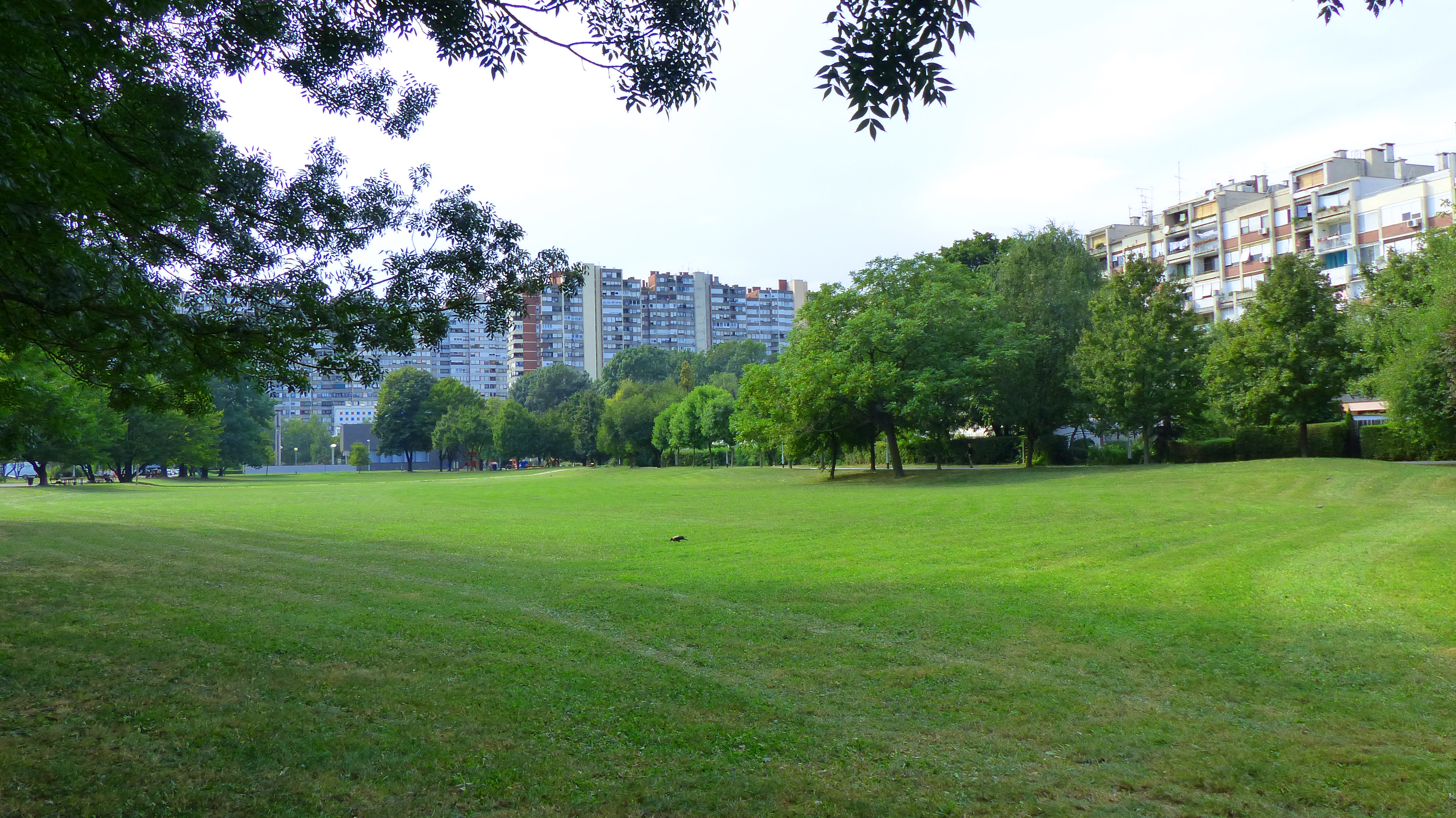
Large green area in the center of settlement Travno - Park Travno in Zagreb

== See also ==
- Church of St. Luke the Evangelist, Zagreb
