= St. John the Evangelist Church (Grushevskaya) =

Church of St. John the Evangelist
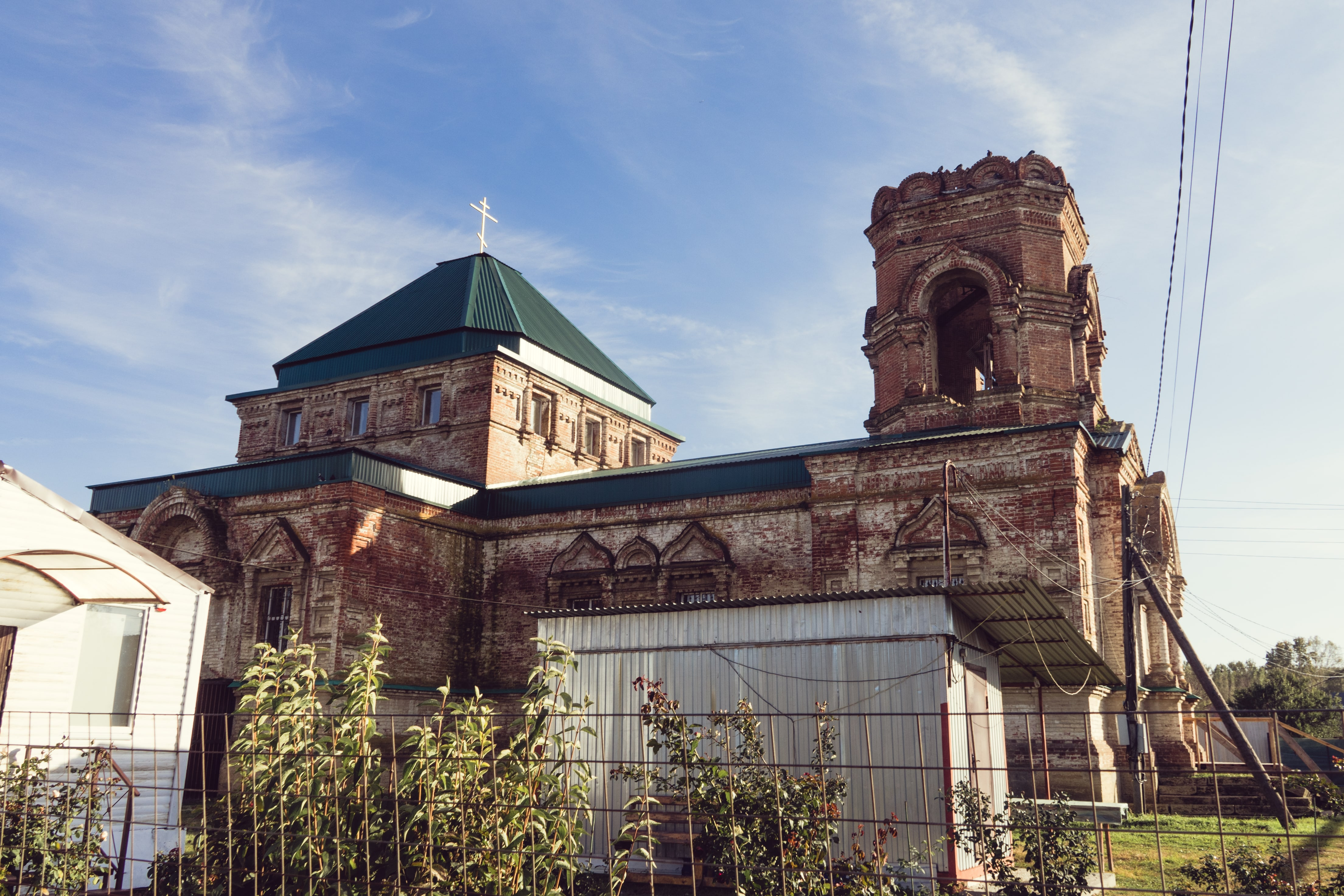

Religion
- Affiliation: Russian Orthodox

Location
- Location: Grushevskaya stanitsa, Ust-Donetsky District, Rostov Oblast, Russia
- Interactive map of Church of St. John the Evangelist

Architecture
- Architect: Kulikov
- Completed: 1901

Church of St. John the Evangelist (Russian: Церковь Иоанна Богослова) ― is a Russian Orthodox church in Grushevskaya stanitsa, Aksaysky District, Rostov Oblast, Russia. It belongs to Volgodonsk diocese of Moscow Patriarchate and was built in 1887. It is also an object of Russia's cultural heritage.

== History ==
The church was built in 1901 by the architect Kulikov at the site of the former temporary prayer house, which was set up in 1877 after a major fire in the Church of St. Barbara, which had burned down a year earlier. The prayer house was moved to another other corner of the village in 1886.

The church survived the Civil War and World War II, but was closed in 1957 during another anti-religious campaign of Nikita Khrushchev. A rural house of culture was opened in the church building, although it was too soon closed, a it did not have enough visitors. Then the building was used as a granary.

In 1959 the roof of the church was broken. The local authorities were going to have the walls dismantled for bricks, but for some reason this did not happen.

Although at the moment the church is in a dilapidated state, it is not abandoned. Since the 1990s, local residents have attempted to rebuild the building. The work on its restoration has been going on slowly for more than a decade and has not been completed up to this day.

Every year on the day of John the Evangelist (October 9) a prayer service is held in the church, which is attended by about 100 people.

== Exterior ==
The building of the church is cross-shaped. The only altar is consecrated in the name of John the Theologian. Entrance gates are crowned with semicircular cornices. The triangular windows are situated on the four sides of the church, three on each. The belfry is two-tier, and in the past, supposedly, it was a three-tiered one. The crosses and domes on it has not preserved.
