= Mamutica =

Apartment complex in Zagreb, Croatia

Coordinates: 45°46′16″N 15°59′41″E

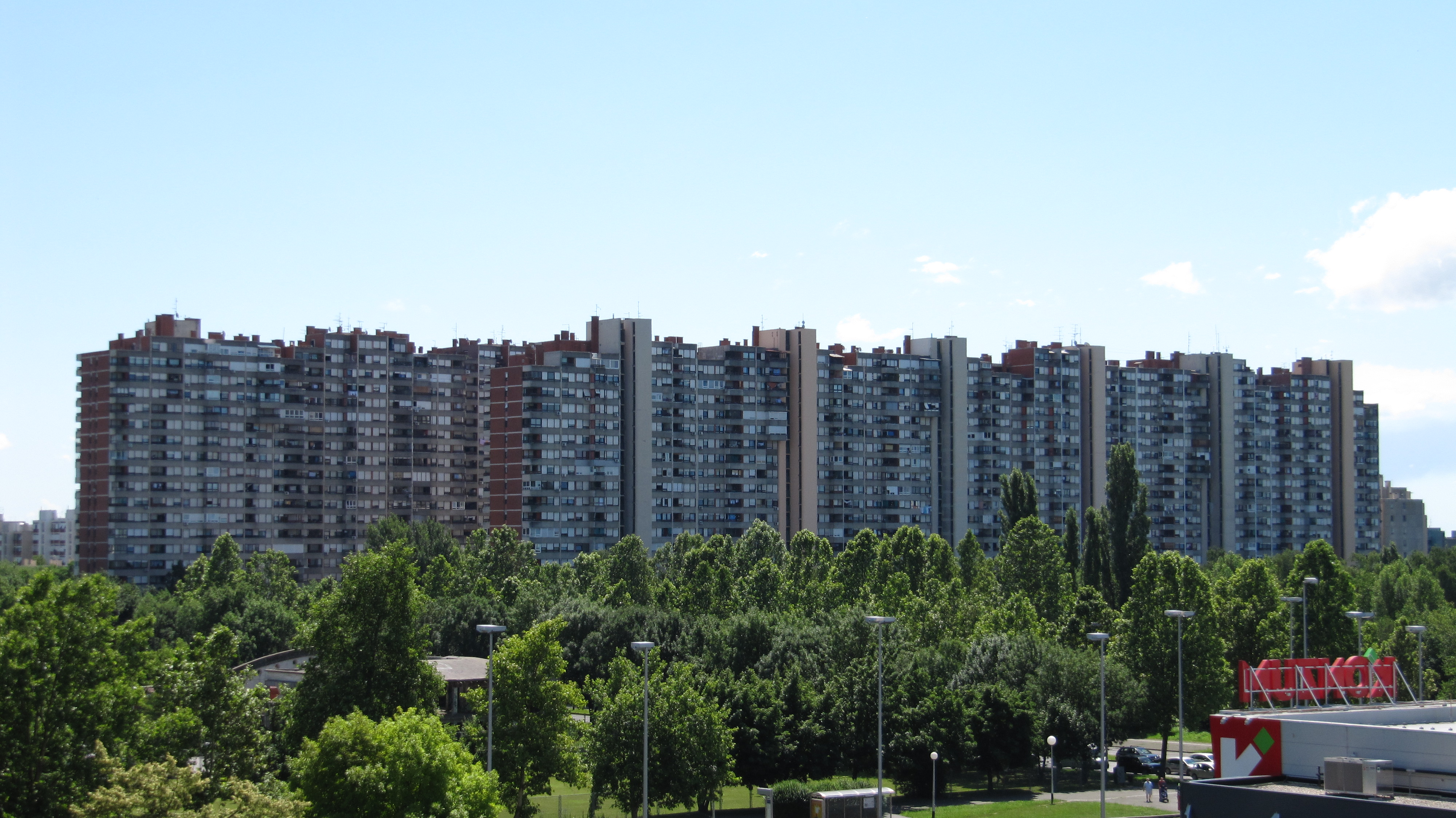
Mamutica

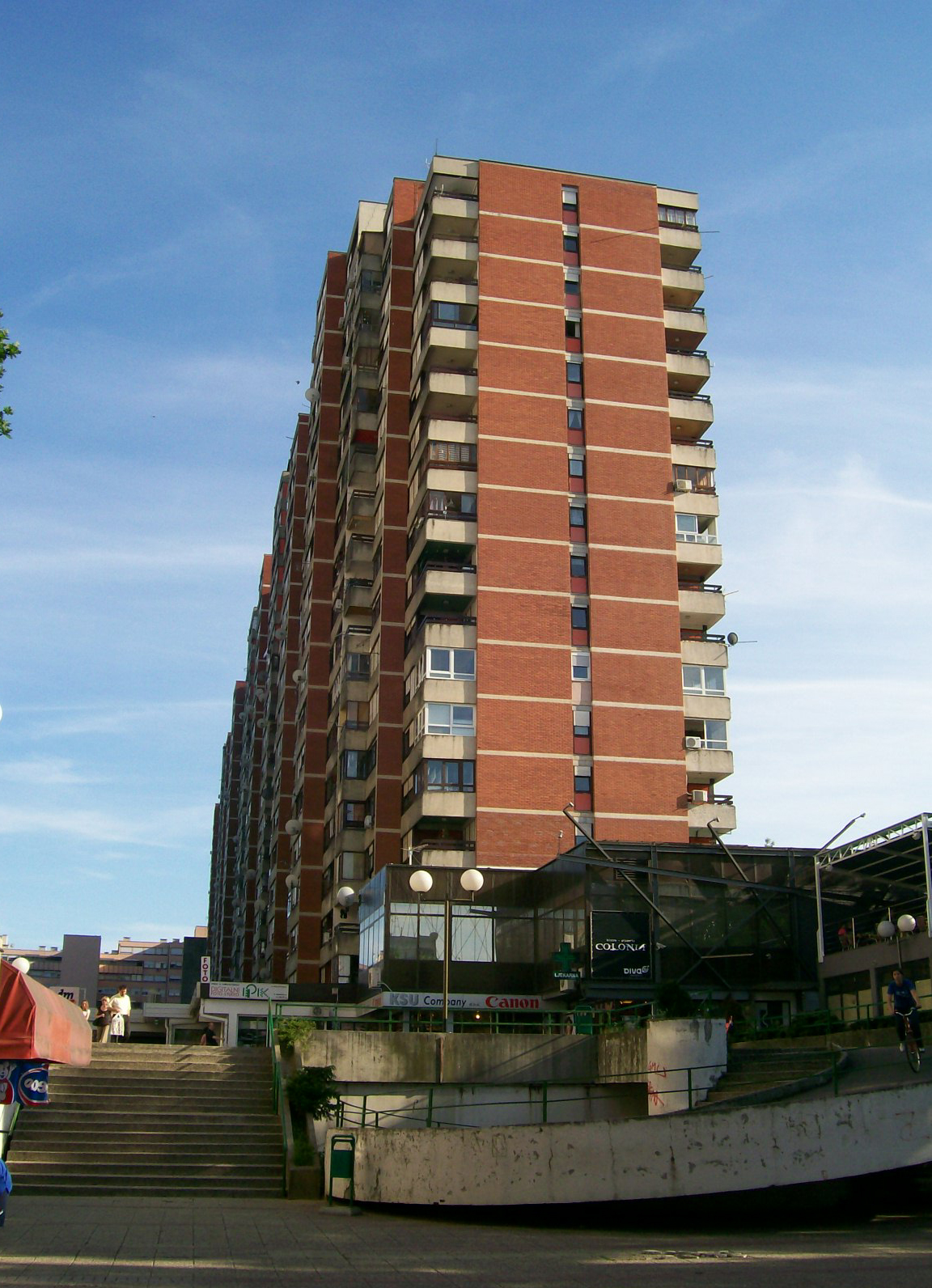
Mamutica from north

Mamutica (English: (female) mammoth) is the largest building (by volume) in Zagreb and Croatia, as well as one of the largest apartment blocks in Europe.

General information
Address Built Construction style Architects	Ulica Božidara Magovca, 10010 Travno, Zagreb, Hrvatska 1974 postmodern architecture Đuro Mirković and Nevenka Postružnik

This apartment complex was built by Industrogradnja in 1974, and designed by prof. Đure Mirković and Nevenka Postružnik. Located in Eastern Novi Zagreb, in the neighborhood of Travno. It is the Croatian version of the panelák or plattenbau. The building is about 240 m long, 60 m high and has 19 populated floors. There are 1,169 apartments in the building, home to about 5,000 people. The building has 6 entrances (big Mamutica) and 3 entrances (small Mamutica).

As part of Mamutica, there are 256 garages and 24 outlets at plateau level.

Mamutica is also the name of a crime TV series broadcast by Croatian Radiotelevision since 2008 (two seasons as of 2010), focusing on police cases being solved in and around the building.

The estimated value of the building (from 2010) is about 135 million EUR.

Only two buildings in Zagreb can withstand the strongest earthquake, Mamutica and Super Andrija.

Because a massive aggregate is located inside the building, in the event of a war, Mamutica was planned to be turned into a hospital.

== Origin of name ==
Not only is Mamutica the largest building in all of Croatia, but it is also still one of the most significant residential buildings in Europe. Therefore, it is interesting that she should have been called Tratinčica (flower Daisy). According to Miroslav Kollenz's urban plan, every building in the Travno district of Zagreb should be named after a meadow flower, but the idea did not come to the realization.

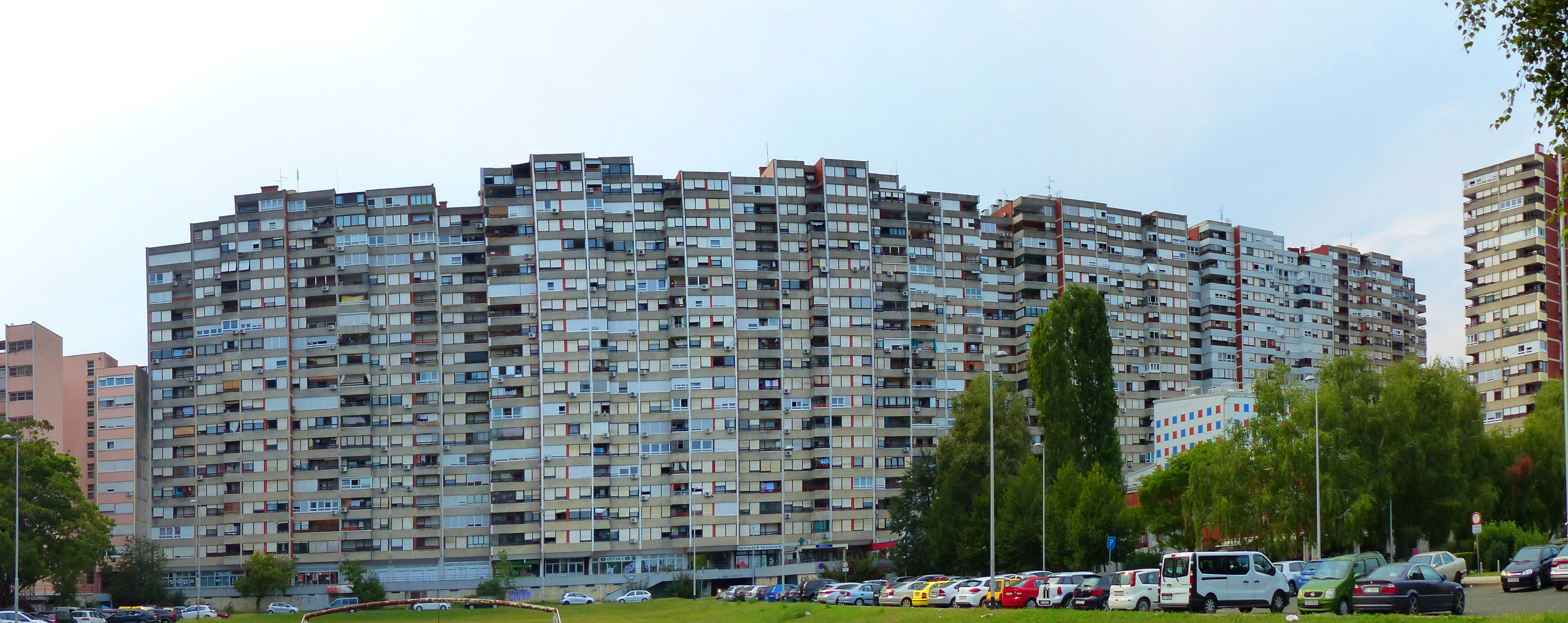
largest building in Zagreb, Croatia

== See also ==
- List of tallest buildings in Croatia
