= Church of St. Luke the Evangelist, Zagreb =

Church of St. Luke the Evangelist (Croatian: Župna crkva sv. Luke evanđelista)
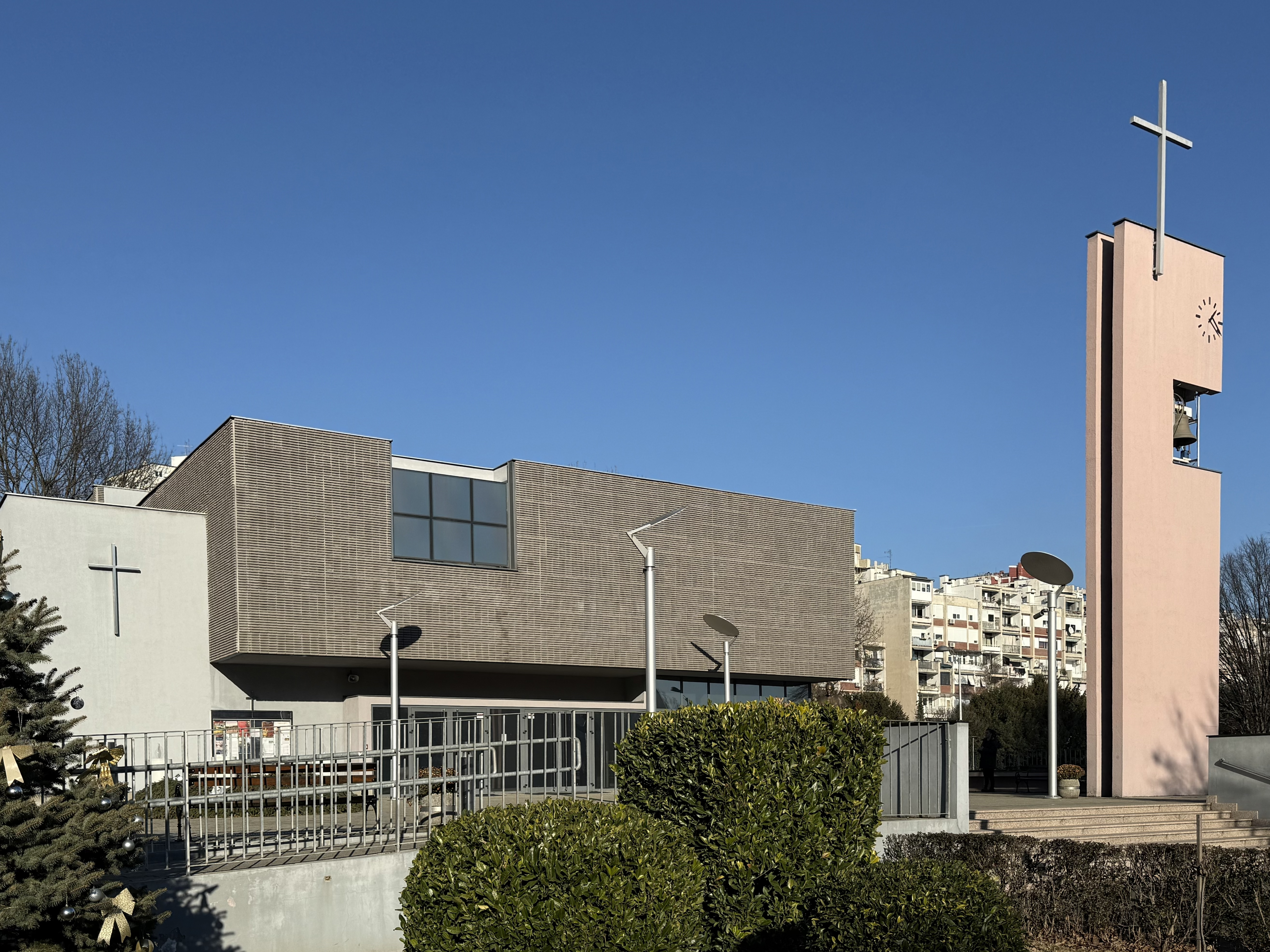
- View of the church
- Church of St. Luke the Evangelist (Croatian: Župna crkva sv. Luke evanđelista)
- 45°46′15″N 15°59′46″E
- Location: Zagreb
- Country: Croatia
- Denomination: Roman Catholic

Architecture
- Functional status: Active
- Completed: 2007

Church of St. Luke the Evangelist, Zagreb (Croatian: Župna crkva sv. Luke evanđelista u Zagrebu) is a Catholic parish church located in the neighbourhood Travno of Zagreb, Croatia.

== History ==
The parish church was built in 2006 and 2007, and on 16 September 2007, it was consecrated by the Archbishop of Zagreb, Cardinal Josip Bozanić.

== Architecture ==
The church was designed by architects Roman Vukoja and Robert Križnjak. The building consists of two basic volumes. The dominant volume is the main church hall, while the smaller volume on the west side is used as the rectory. Both volumes are connected by an open plateau, and the basement contains the church's service and auxiliary spaces, including halls for film screenings, seminars and lectures. When designing, the architects paid special attention to the urban integration of the church into the matrix of the Travno settlement, making it a key element that marks the beginning and end of the settlement's large green area.

The project of the Church of St. Luke the Evangelist was included in the final selection of the five most beautiful religious buildings in the world in the Building of the Year 2010 competition, organized by the renowned magazine ArchDaily.

== Gallery ==
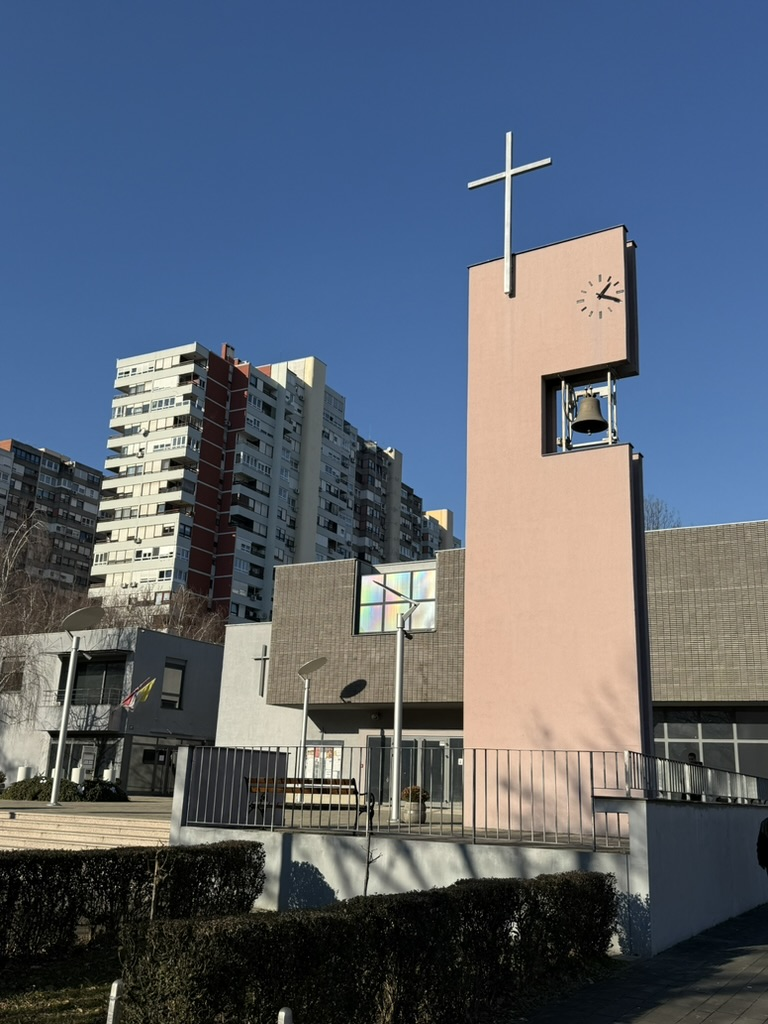
View of the church

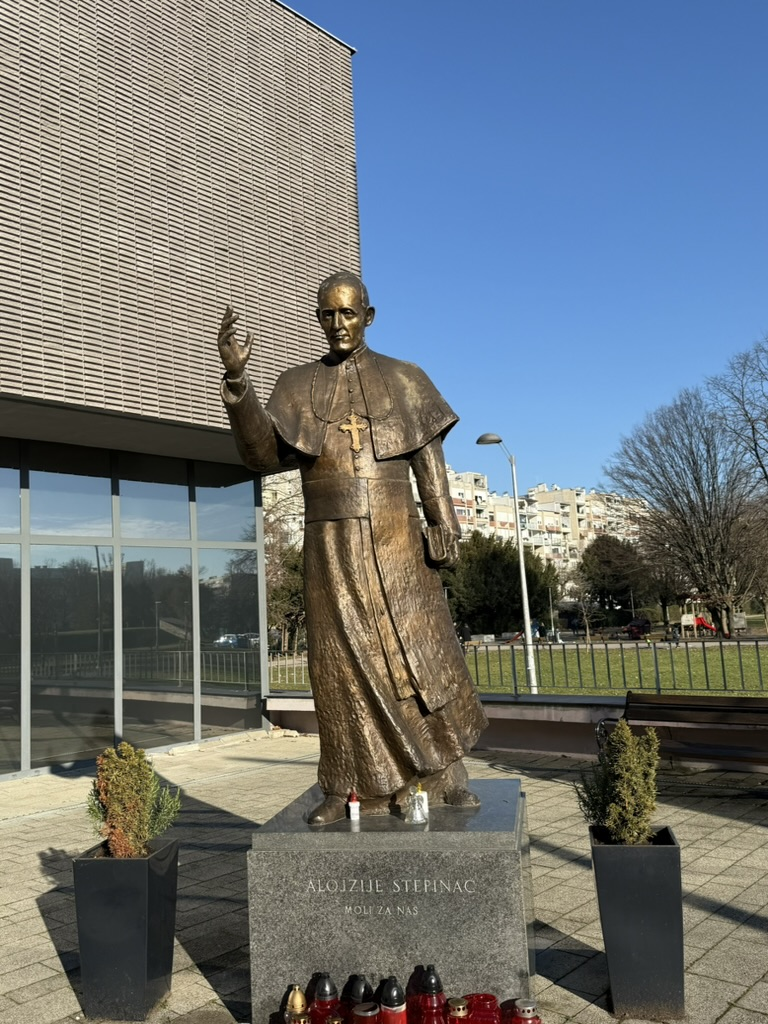
Sculpture in front of the church, Blessed Alojzije Stepinac
