= St. Barbara Church (Grushevskaya) =

Coordinates: 47.2621°N 39.5924°E

Church of the Holy Great Martyr Barbara
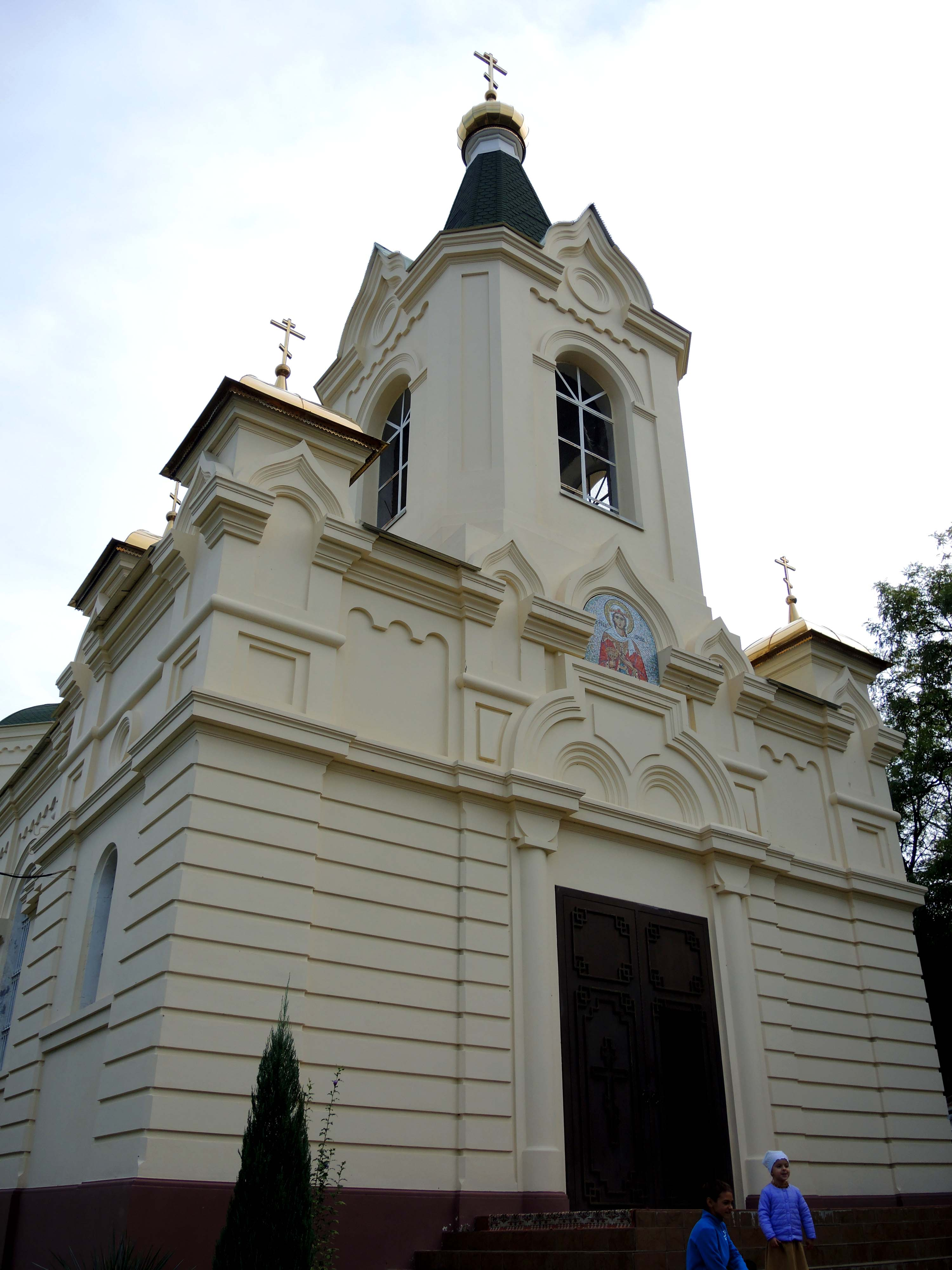

Religion
- Affiliation: Russian Orthodox

Location
- Location: Grushevskaya stanitsa, Ust-Donetsky District, Rostov Oblast, Russia
- Interactive map of Church of the Holy Great Martyr Barbara

Architecture
- Completed: 1884

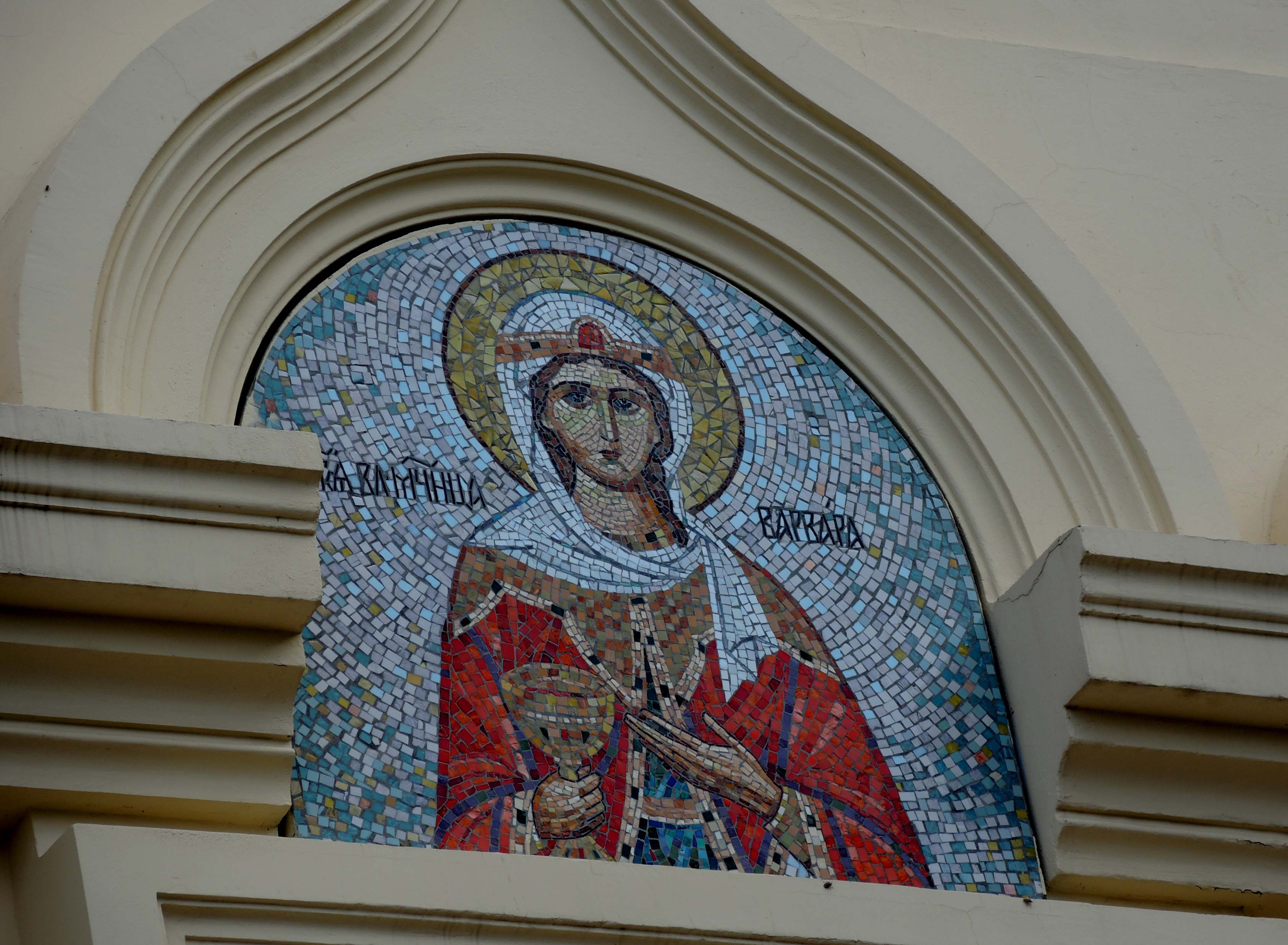
Mosaic above the main entrance

Church of the Holy Great Martyr Barbara (Russian: Церковь Святой Великомученицы Варвары) is a Russian Orthodox church in Grushevskaya stanitsa, Aksaysky District, Rostov Oblast, Russia. It belongs to Volgodonsk diocese of Moscow Patriarchate and was built in 1884.

== History ==
The church, consecrated in the name of St. Barbara, was built for the first time in the village of Grushevskaya in 1781. This church was wooden, and a bell tower was adjoined directly to its building. In 1830 the church was renovated and transferred to a stone foundation. The second major repair was carried out almost 30 years after, in 1859. Nevertheless, on August 1, 1876, the renewed church burned to ashes because of unknown reasons.

In the following 1877 year, on the site of the burnt church, local residents built a prayer house and also addressed to the Don Metropolitan with a request for permission to build a stone church.

It is unknown when exactly the construction of the new stone church began, yet it is assumed that the construction work took 5–6 years and was done in 1884: on October 21, the temple was consecrated by Dean Antony Manohin.

In the first years after the establishment of Soviet power, the villagers tried to protect the church from ant encroachments, and divine services continued to be held there. Nevertheless, in the 1930s the authorities managed to close the church, but not for a long time: already in 1943, during the German occupation, it was opened again. At the same time, the altar part of the temple was damaged by fragments of an air bomb. In 1975, the villagers managed to bring the appearance of the church to its original form.

In 1960s out-of-towners ripped the cross off from the dome, but local residents drove out the intruders. In the 1980s the church was renovated.

At the current moment, there is a Sunday school in the parish and a library.

== Exterior and interior ==
The church building is cross-shaped. It has two chapels - the first one in the name of the Holy Great Martyr Barbara and in the name of St. George the Victorious. On the perimeter of the facade, the walls are decorated with decorative cornices. The central dome is four-sided, with beveled edges and has four windows on each side. The belltower is square, and it is topped with a drum and an onion above it. Inside there are many icons, both recently written and renovated ones.
