= St John the Evangelist Church, Islington =

Coordinates: 51.534°N 0.1033°W

St John the Evangelist Church
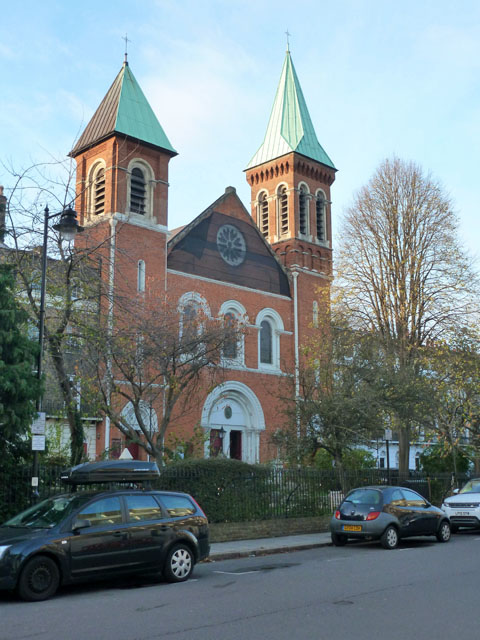
- St John the Evangelist Church
- OS grid reference: TQ 31649 83385
- Location: Islington
- Country: England
- Denomination: Catholic
- Website: Official website

History
- Status: Parish church
- Dedication: John the Evangelist
- Consecrated: 26 June 1873

Architecture
- Functional status: Active
- Heritage designation: Grade II listed
- Designated: 29 September 1972
- Architect: Joseph John Scoles
- Style: Romanesque Revival
- Groundbreaking: 27 September 1841
- Completed: 26 June 1843

Administration
- Province: Westminster
- Archdiocese: Westminster
- Deanery: Islington
- Parish: Islington

St John the Evangelist Church is a Catholic parish church in Islington, London. It was built from 1841 to 1843, seven years before the Reestablishment of the Catholic hierarchy in 1850. It was designed by Joseph John Scoles, with parts of the interior by Edward Armitage. Architecturally, it is in the Romanesque Revival style. It is located on Duncan Terrace to the east of Upper Street close to the centre of Islington. It is a Grade II listed building.

== History ==
=== Foundation ===
After the English Reformation, during the time of recusancy, until the Roman Catholic Relief Act 1829, Catholics were recorded by the government authorities as being in Islington. In 1577 and 1588, a few Catholics were reported. In 1584, a Catholic priest, Thomas Worthington was arrested in Islington. Other priests were reported to be hiding in the area: a Fr Williams and Thomas Clarke in 1592, and three stayed around 1600. In 1626, evidence of a Catholic Mass was discovered in Islington. In 1680, two Catholics were reported to be in Islington, and one in 1708. In 1733, a small community of converts was founded in the area by a Fr Christopher Piggot. In the late 1700s, three or four Catholics were reported to exist. In 1837, priests came from St Mary Moorfields and built a school in Duncan Street. In 1839, a chapel was built in the school. By 1840, there were 600 Catholics recorded in Islington, who were mostly migrants from Ireland.

=== Construction ===
With the congregation continuing to grow, a larger church was needed. On 27 September 1841, the foundation stone of the church was laid and blessed by Bishop Thomas Griffiths, the Vicar Apostolic of the London District. The architect of the church was the same person who designed the school chapel, Joseph John Scoles. He also designed many other notable churches such as the Church of the Immaculate Conception, Farm Street and St Francis Xavier Church, Liverpool, for the Jesuits. Whereas he was mainly behind the construction of churches in the Gothic Revival style, St John the Evangelist Church was in the Romanesque Revival style, and was influenced by the mother church of the Jesuits, the Church of the Gesù. However, it was not without criticism. According to Historic England, Augustus Pugin "castigated" the church calling it "the most original combination of modern deformity that has been executed for some time past". Nevertheless, the architect Joseph Hansom defended the building in the architecture journal, The Builder, stating that Pugin needed saving "from himself", and that the church is "fine and noble". On 26 June 1843, the church was opened in a ceremony presided by Bishop Griffiths, but the two towers on the front of the church were not finished. They were designed by Scoles to be symmetrical, but when they were finished in 1877, they were made asymmetrical, as decided by the priest at that time, Canon Oakeley. The church was consecrated on 26 June 1873.

=== Developments ===
In 1855, what became the Sacred Heart chapel was painted. In 1859, the fresco in the St Francis of Assisi side chapel was painted by Edward Armitage. From 1861 to 1862, he went on to paint the fresco of Jesus and his apostles in the apse of the church. In 1872, the altar and tabernacle were installed. They were designed by Goldie and Child and built by Thomas Earp. In 1882, the St Francis chapel was further furnished according to designs of Joseph Connolly. In 1884, the stations of the cross was added. In the 1960s and 1970s, further changes were made to the church. From 1963 to 1964, the organ was rebuilt. From 1977 to 1978, the crypt was excavated. In 1973, the church was reordered with the altar installed in its current position.

== Parish ==
The church is next to St John the Evangelist Primary School. The church has four Sunday Masses at 6:00 pm on Saturday and at 10:00 am, 12:00 pm and 6:30 pm on Sunday.

== Interior ==
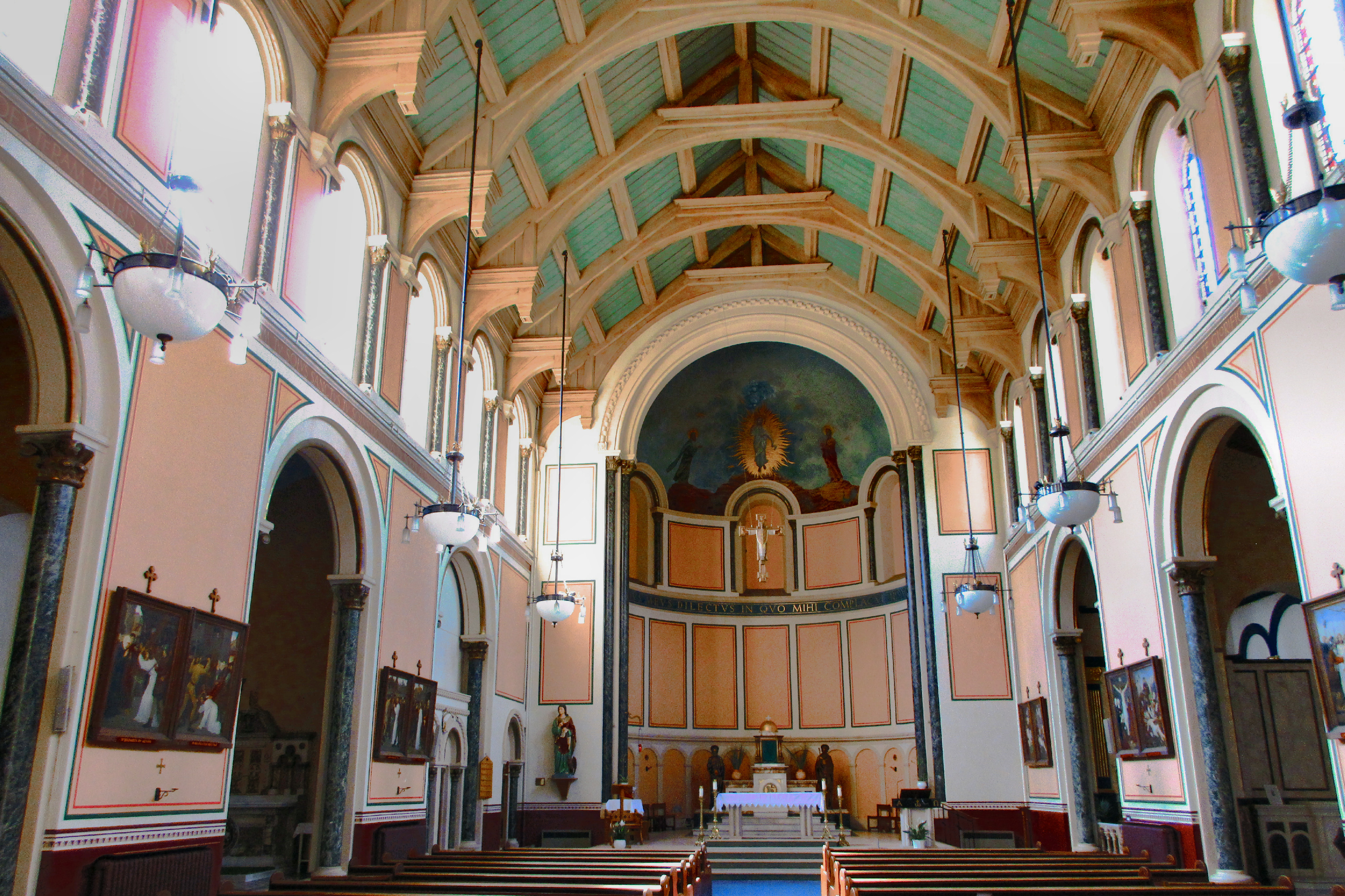
Interior

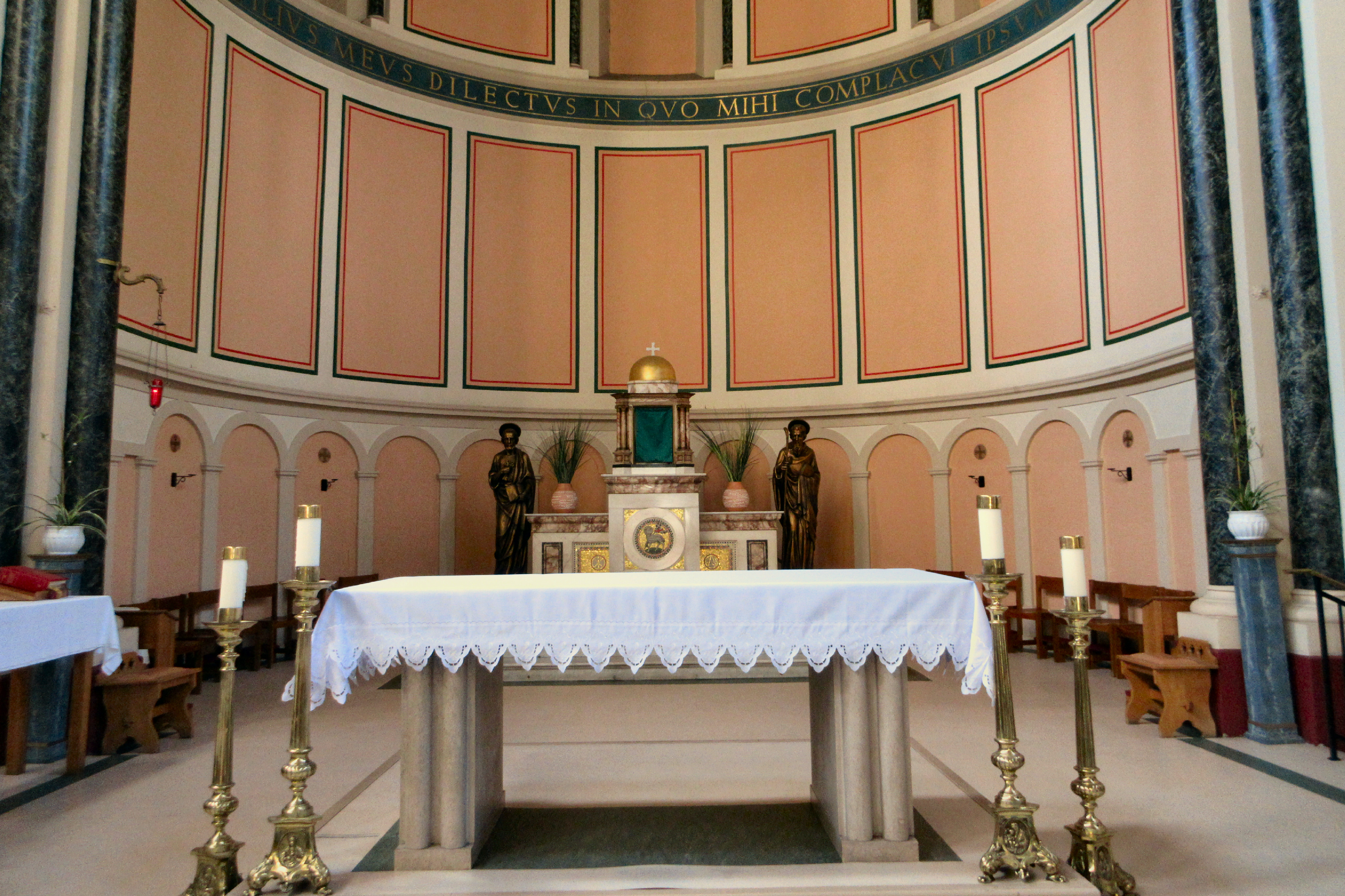
Altar

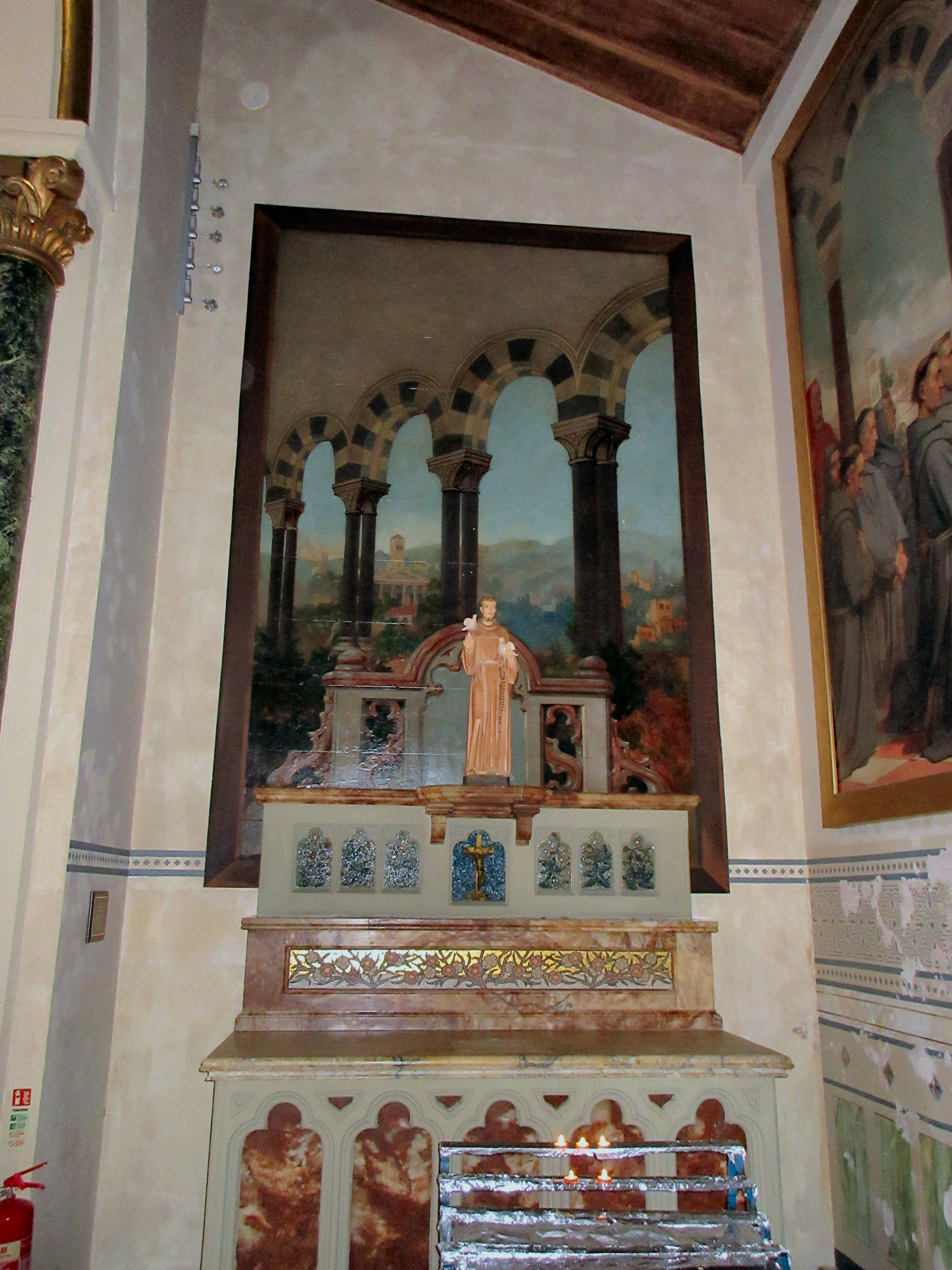
St Francis chapel

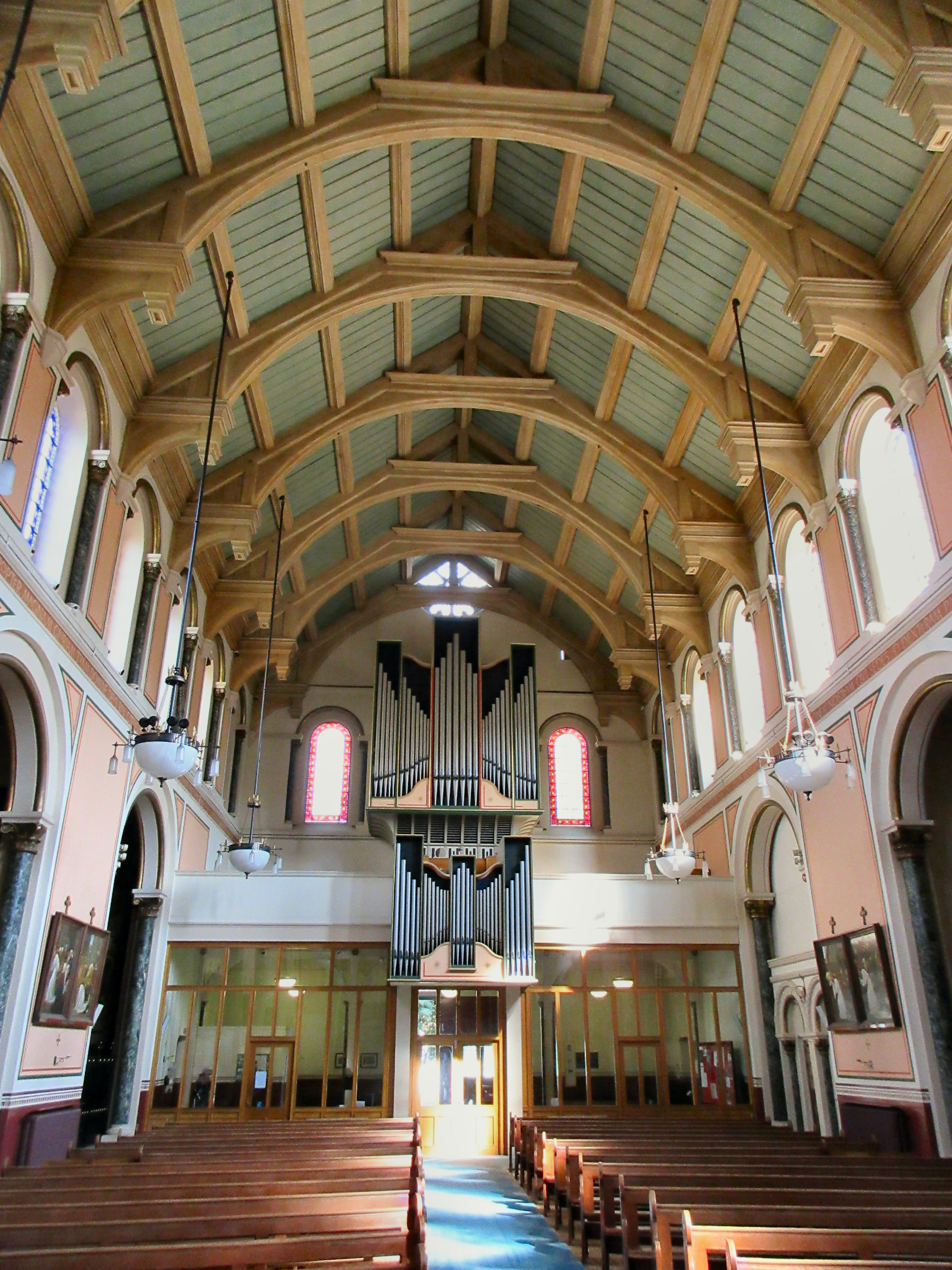
Organ

== See also ==
- Archdiocese of Westminster
