= Sveta Klara =

Neighbourhood of Zagreb, Croatia

Coordinates: 45.760662°N 15.960715°E

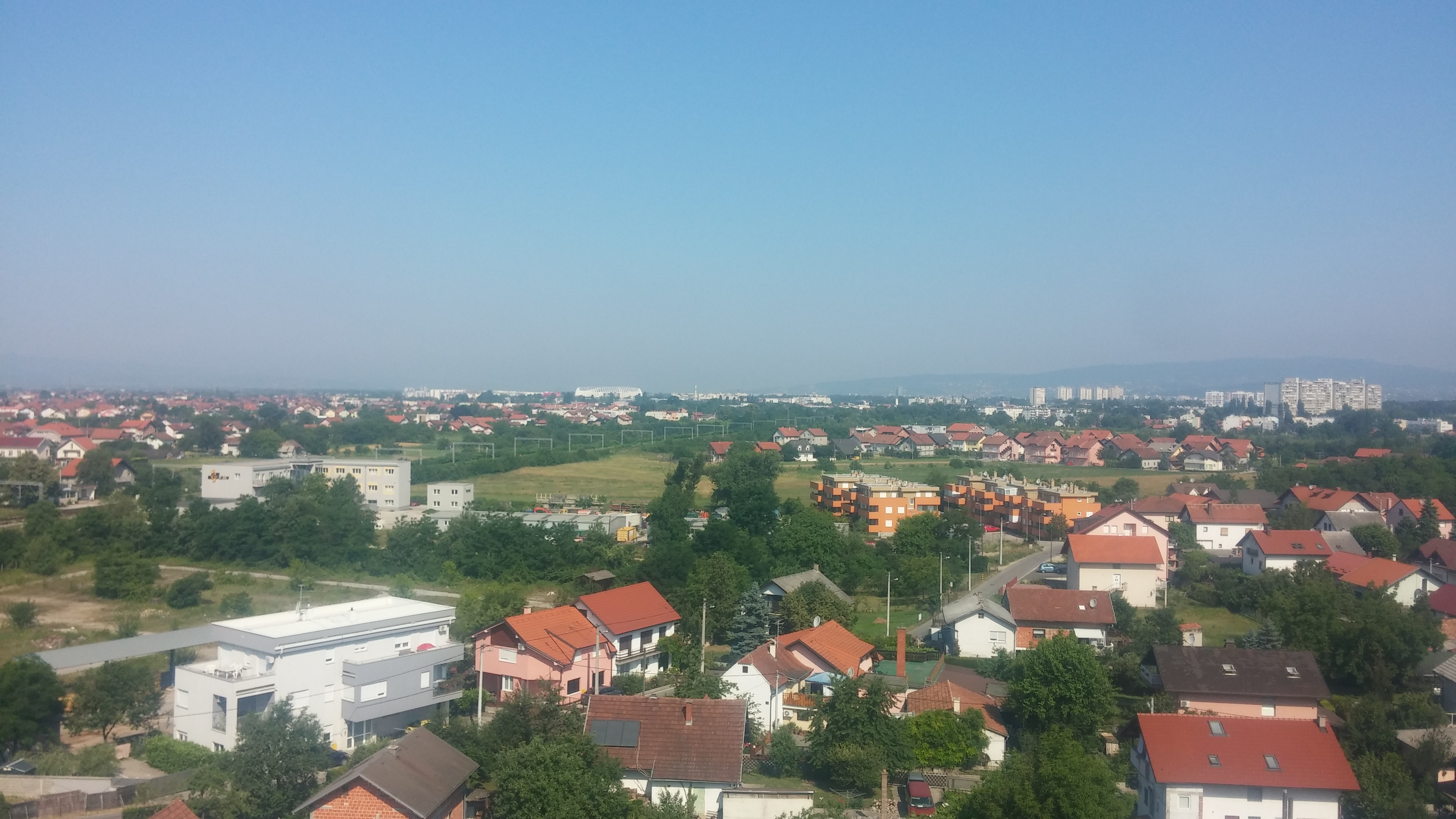
- Interactive map of Sveta Klara

Sveta Klara ('Saint Clara') is a neighbourhoud in southern Zagreb, Croatia. Once a separate village, it is now administered as a neighbourhood of the city district of Novi Zagreb – zapad. The population is 11,097 (as of Census 2021).

The Church of St. Clare the Virgin was built here in 1768 on a mediaeval site.

In the last two decades, Sveta Klara has undergone rapid urbanisation as it became integrated into Zagreb’s contiguous built-up area. The neighbourhood has become a particularly controversial case of poorly managed urban expansion in the city and Croatia, shaped by deficiencies in both detailed and general urban planning.

Once a quiet suburban settlement characterised primarily by detached family houses, Sveta Klara has been transformed by intensive residential construction that has not been matched by adequate transport infrastructure, public services, green spaces, or community facilities, resulting in severe pressure on the existing urban fabric and a markedly overcrowded built environment.
