= Church of St. Clare the Virgin, Zagreb =

Church of St. Clare the Virgin (Croatian: Župna crkva sv. Klare djevice)
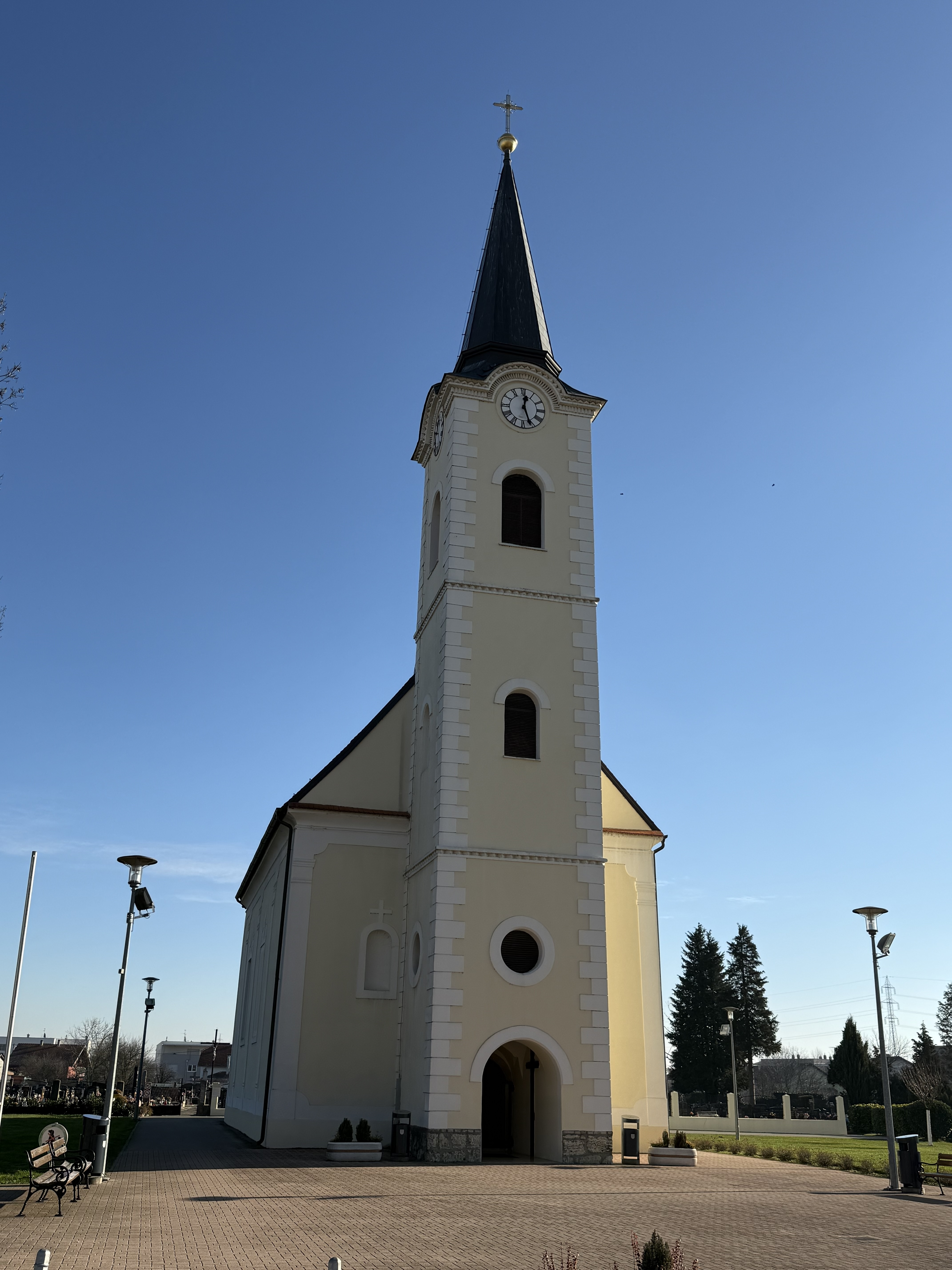
- Church in 2025
- Church of St. Clare the Virgin (Croatian: Župna crkva sv. Klare djevice)
- 45°45′23″N 15°58′19″E
- Location: Zagreb
- Country: Croatia
- Denomination: Roman Catholic

Architecture
- Functional status: Active
- Architectural type: Baroque
- Completed: 1768; 258 years ago

Church of St. Clare the Virgin, Zagreb (Croatian: Župna crkva sv. Klare djevice u Zagrebu) is a Catholic parish church located in the neighbourhood Sveta Klara of Zagreb, Croatia. The church was built in 1768.

== History ==
The Church of St. Clare was first mentioned in the 14th century, when it is assumed that it was only a wooden building. The present brick church was built in the 18th century, as confirmed by the inscription on the keystone of the entrance portal. Over the centuries, the church has been renovated several times, and a significant renovation was carried out in 2016 to mark the 650th anniversary of the Parish.

== Architecture and artwork ==
The church belongs to the hall type of sacral buildings, with a semicircular apse of the sanctuary and a sacristy located on the south side. The main facade is dominated by a three-story bell tower with a rectangular ground plan, topped with a pyramidal roof. The interior is designed with baldachin vaults resting on pilasters with richly profiled capitals, which divides the nave space into two bays.

The choir has a wavy parapet supported by two stone pillars, while above the vaulted sacristy is the oratory.

The interior of the church is adorned with illusionistic frescoes from 1797, which are preserved on the north wall of the nave and the triumphal arch, where the year of creation is inscribed inside a medallion. The parapet of the choir is painted with scenes from the life of St. Isidore. The church's stained glass windows were made in 1925.

== Gallery ==
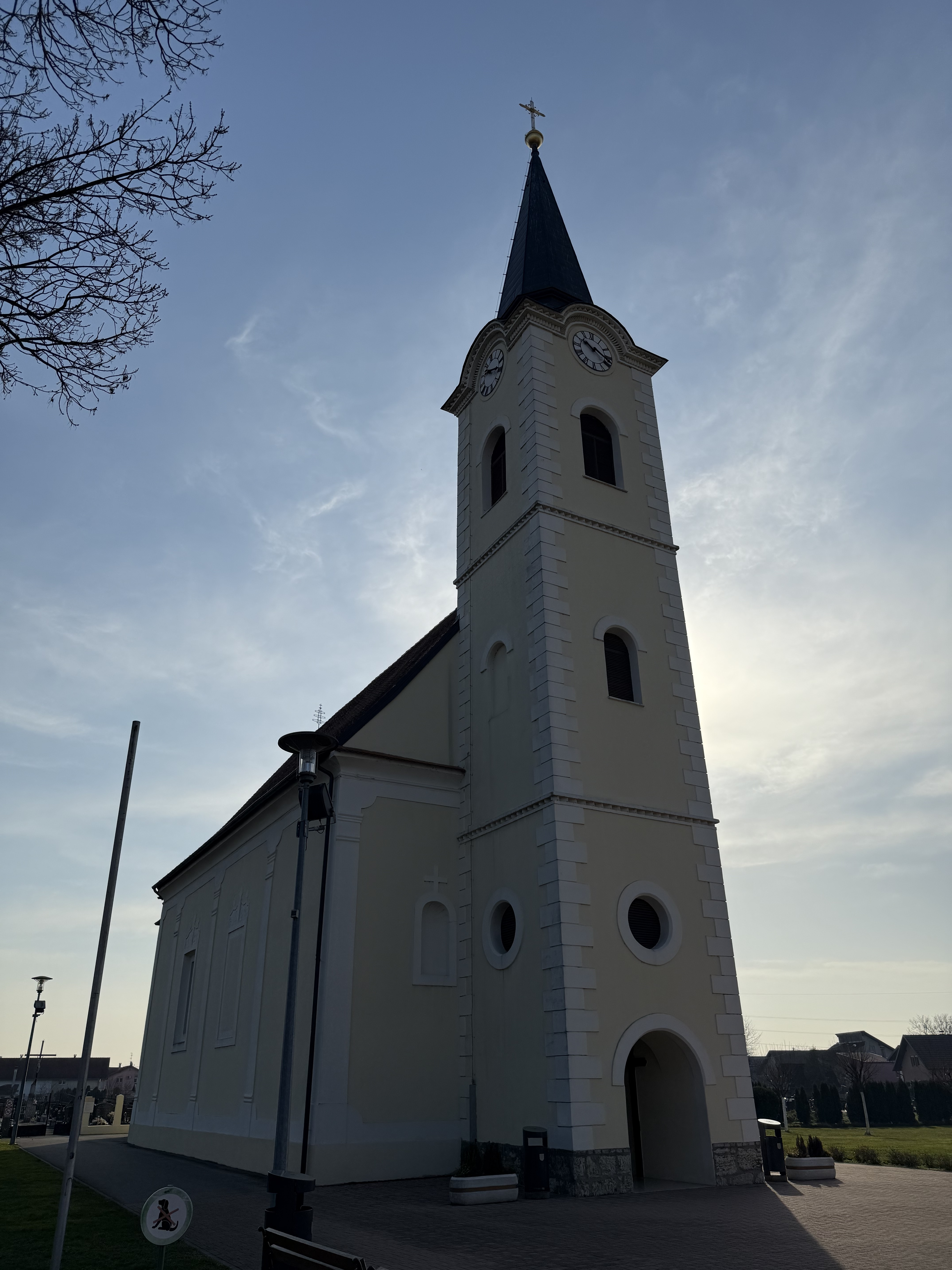
View of the church

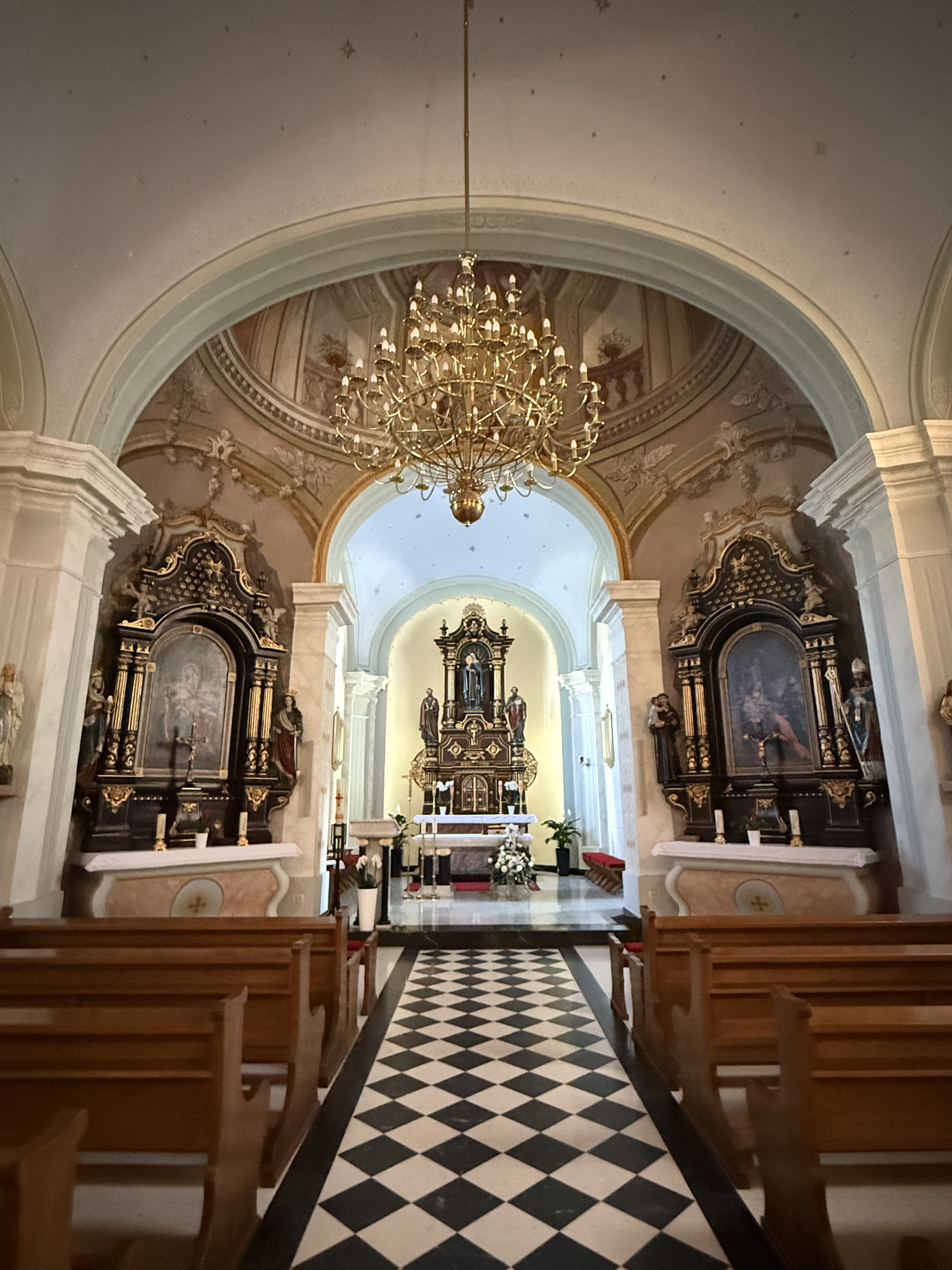
View from the entrance towards the altar

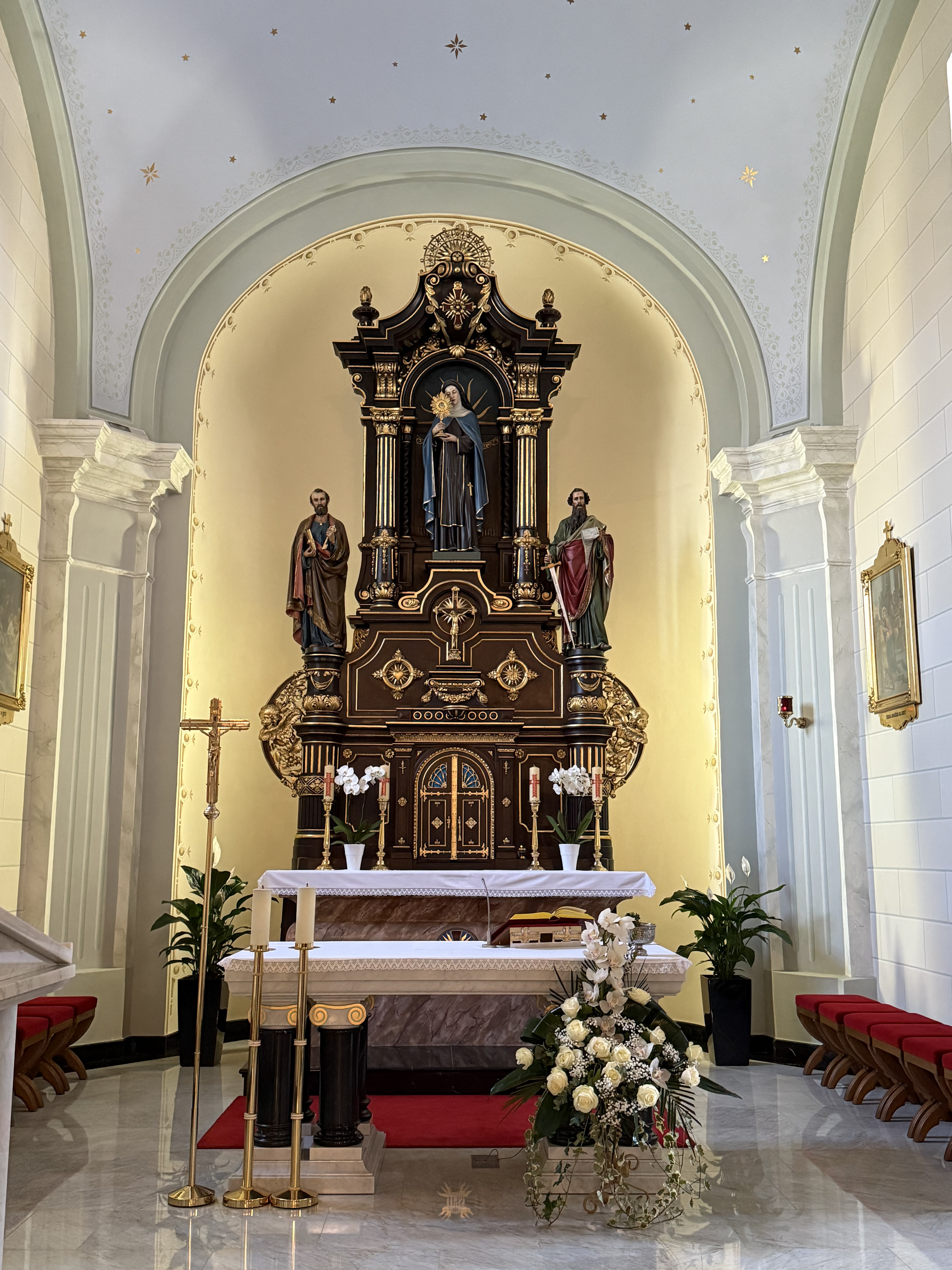
Interior of the church

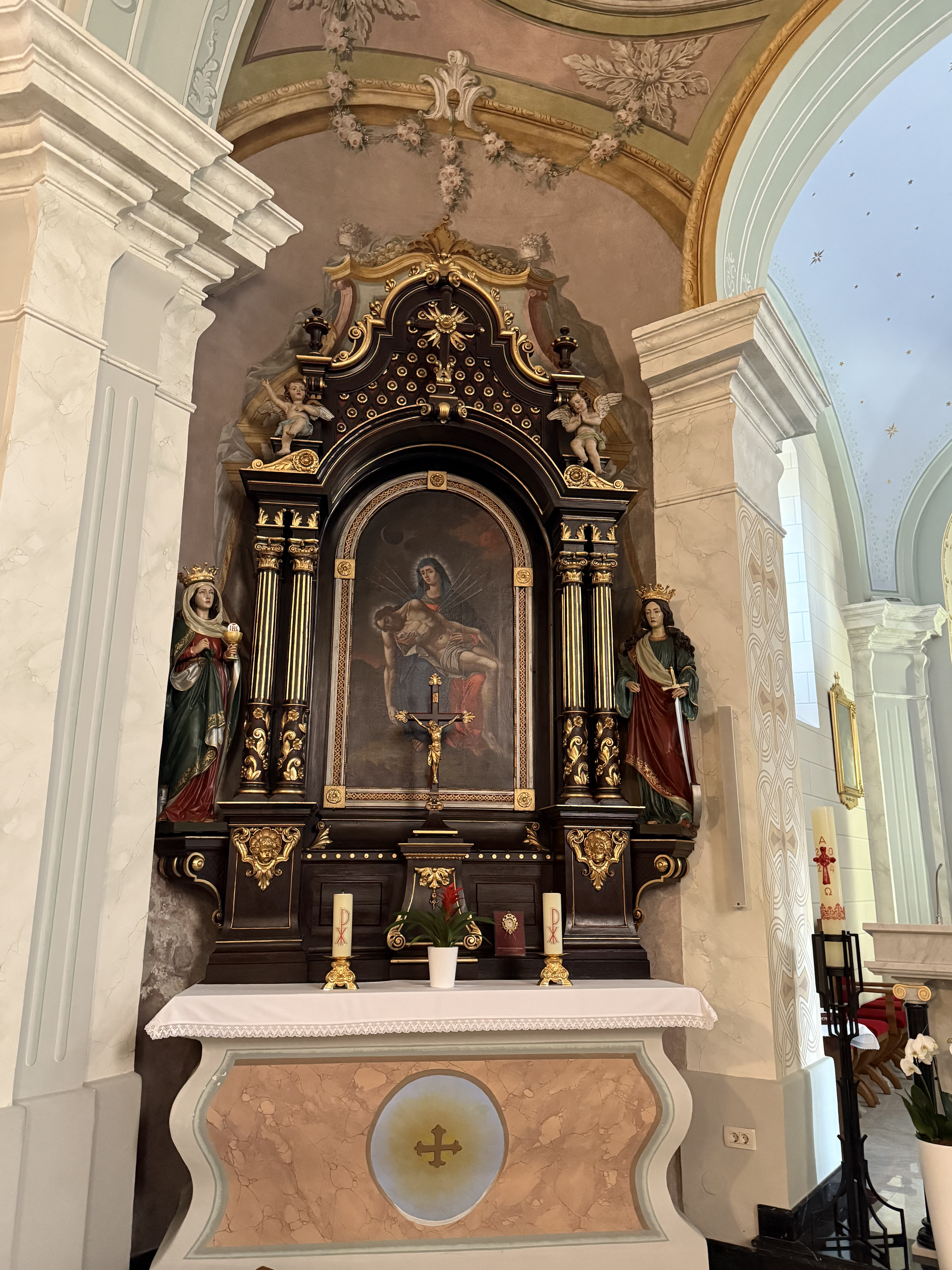
Interior of the church

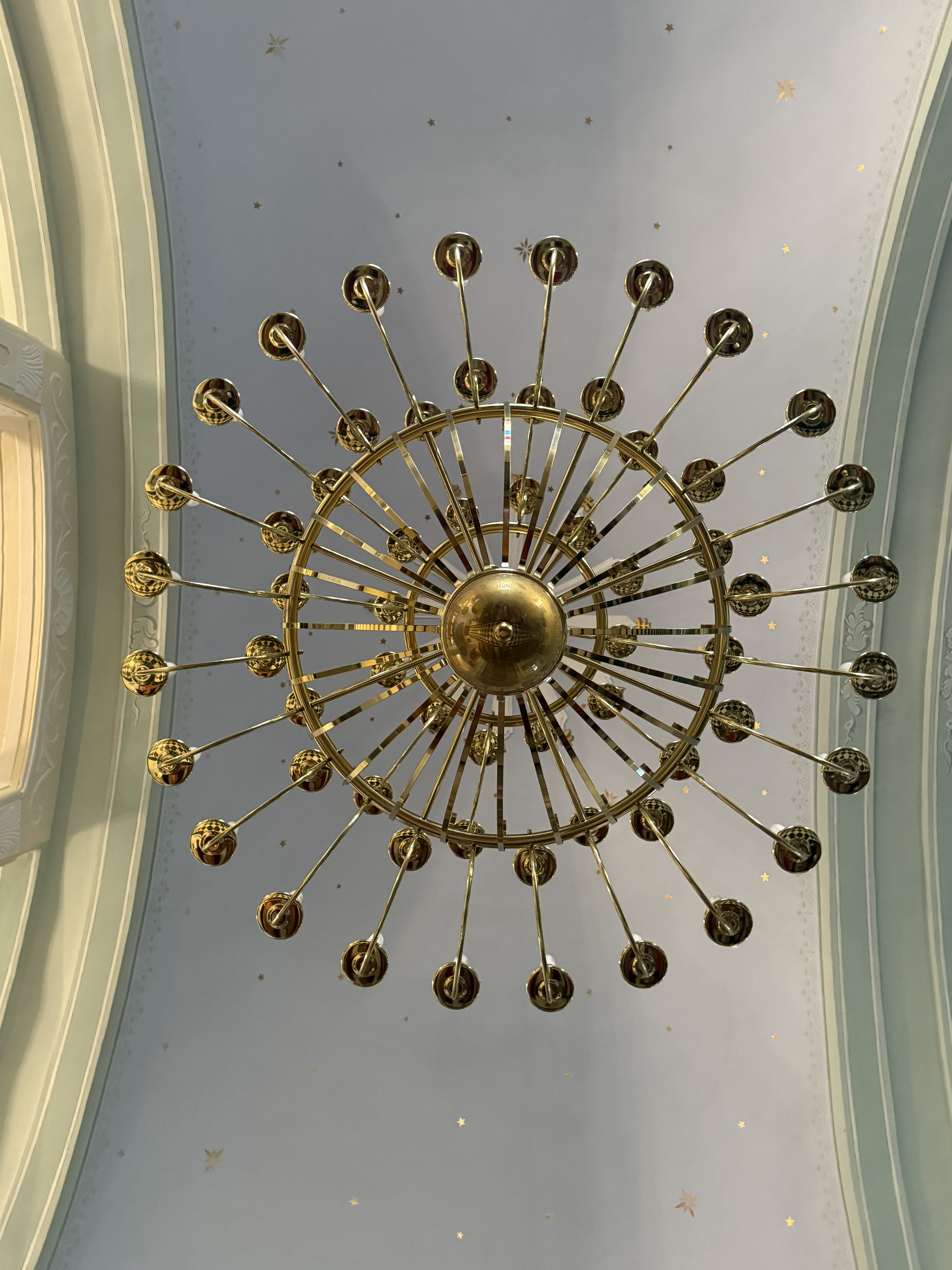
Interior of the church (chandelier)

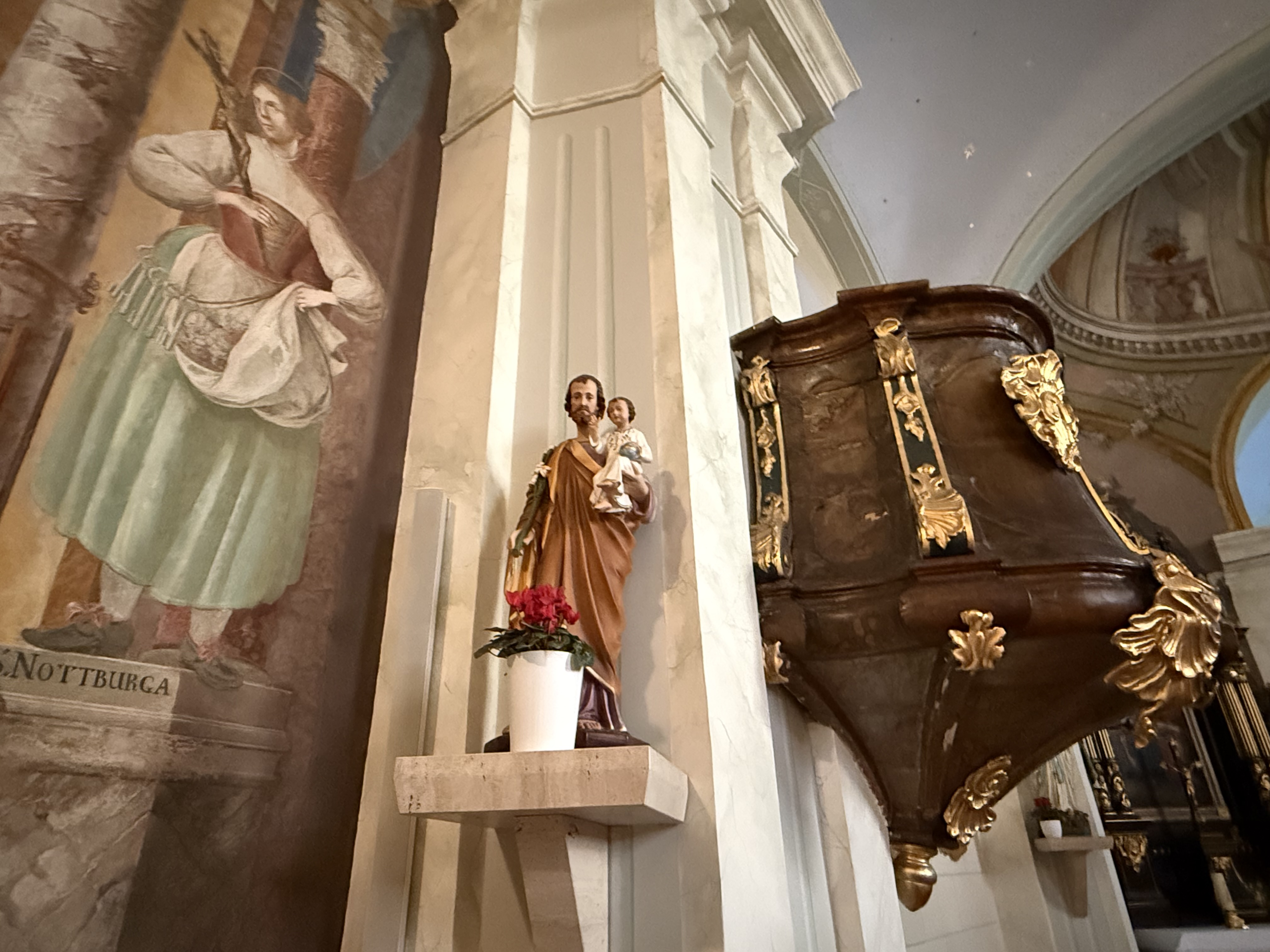
Interior of the church (sculptures and frescoes)

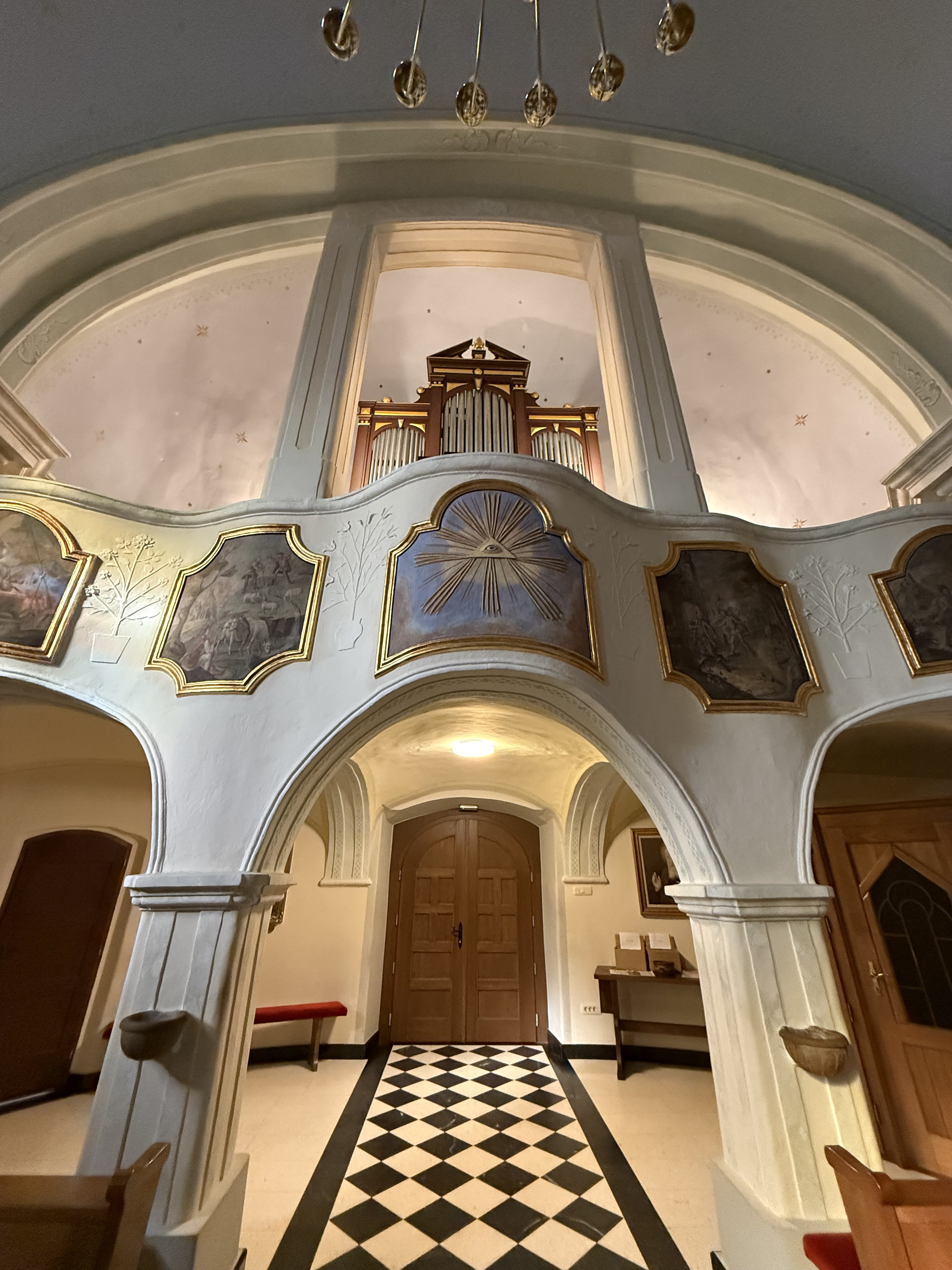
The choir and choir parapet painted with scenes from the life of St. Isidore
