= Heinrich Reinhardt (composer) =

Austrian composer

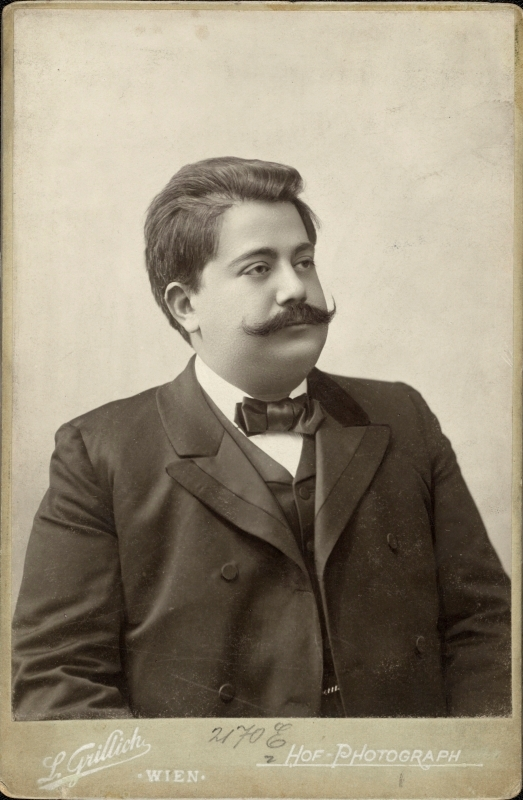
Heinrich Reinhardt, c. 1900, by Ludwig Grillich

Heinrich Reinhardt (1865–1922) was an Austrian composer. He died on 31 January 1922 in Vienna and is buried at the Döbling Cemetery.

== Biography ==
Reinhardt was born on 13 April 1865 in Pressburg (now Bratislava). The son of a jeweller, he went to Vienna to study at the conservatory of the Gesellschaft der Musikfreunde where he was one of Anton Bruckner's pupils. He became an accomplished pianist and organist, and his familiarity with several other instruments later served him well as orchestrator of his own works and those of others. Between 1890 and 1900 he published numerous songs, piano and salon pieces, as well as an opera, Die Minnekönigin (1895).

He also wrote music reports for the Neue Freie Presse, Neues Wiener Journal and Die Zeit, but abandoned this after the tremendous success of his first operetta, Das süsse Mädel (Carltheater, 25 October 1901). It opened a new phase for Viennese operetta, being more overtly in the song and dance musical comedy style. However, Reinhardt's dozen later works were eclipsed by those of Edmund Eysler, Franz Lehár, Oscar Straus and Leo Fall.

== Compositions ==
=== Operas ===
- Die Minnekönigin (1895)
- Der Söldner (1922)

=== Operettas ===
- Das süsse Mädel (1901)
- Der liebe Schatz (1902)
- Der General-Konsul (1904)
- Krieg im Frieden (1906)
- Die süssen Grisetten (1907)
- Ein Märchen für alles (1908)
- Die Sprudelfee (1909)
- Die siamesischen Zwillinge (1909)
- Studentenhochzeit (1910)
- Miss Exzentrik (1910)
- Napoleon und die Frauen (1911)
- Prinzessin Gretl (1914)
- Die erste Frau (1915)
- Der Gast der Königs (1916)
- Der Glückstrompeter (1922)
- Grisettenliebe (1928)
- Der Schuster von Delft (?)

== Sources ==
- Free scores by Heinrich Reinhardt (composer) at the International Music Score Library Project (IMSLP)
- Andrew Lamb: "Heinrich Reinhardt", Grove Music Online ed. L. Macy (Accessed 20 September 2008), (subscription access)
- Ch. Harten: "Reinhardt Heinrich". In: Österreichisches Biographisches Lexikon 1815–1950 (ÖBL). Vol. 9, Austrian Academy of Sciences, Vienna 1988, ISBN 3-7001-1483-4, p. 43.
