= Döbling Cemetery =

Cemetery in Vienna, Austria

Döblinger Friedhof
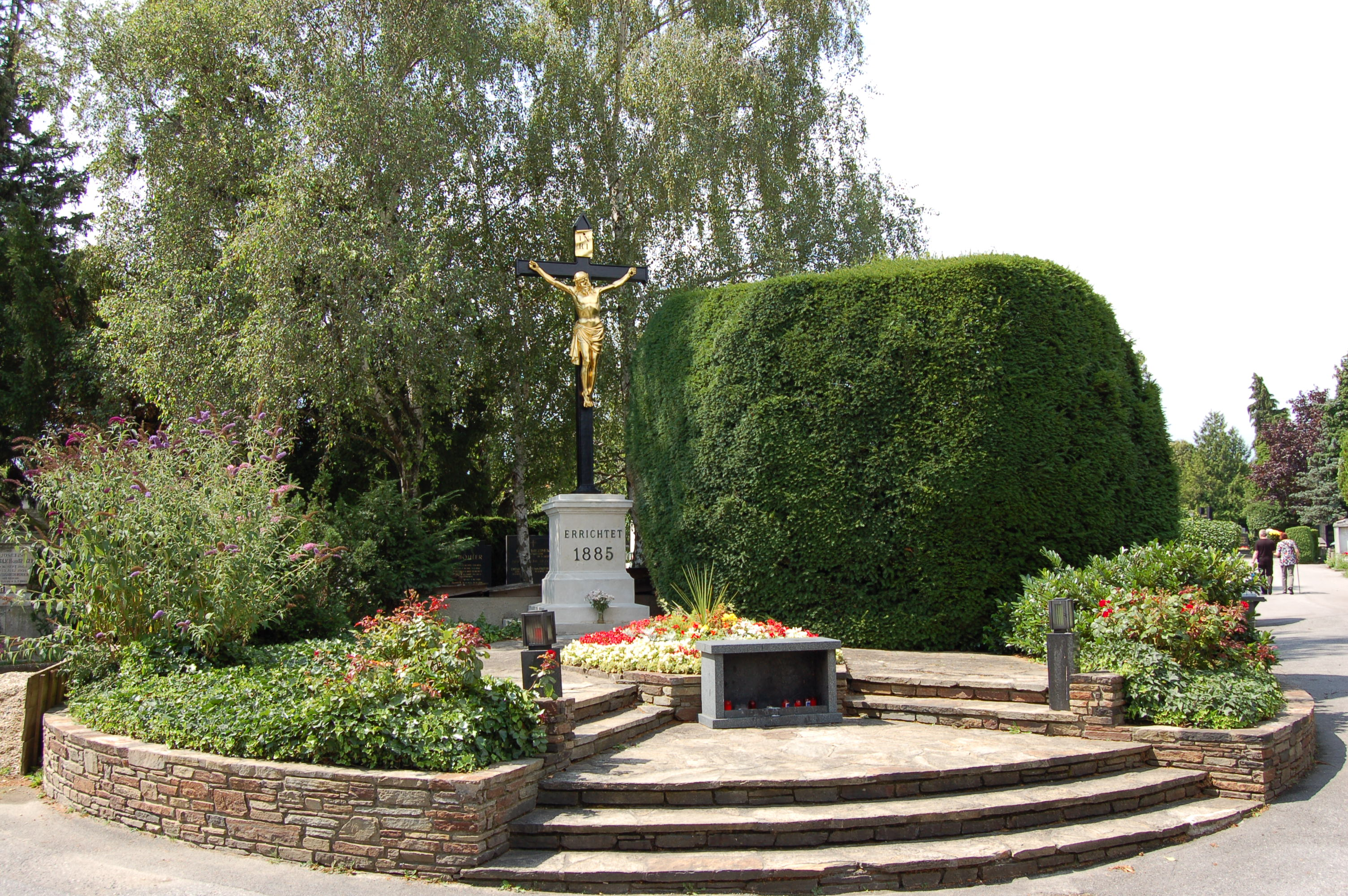
- A 19th century cross at the cemetery
- Interactive map of Döblinger Friedhof

Details
- Established: 1880
- Location: Döbling, Vienna
- Country: Austria
- Coordinates: 48°14′19″N 16°19′41″E
- Type: Public
- Size: 49,981 square metres (12.351 acres)
- No. of graves: 6,853

The Döbling Cemetery (Döblinger Friedhof) is a cemetery in the 19th district of Döbling in Vienna, Austria.

== Location ==
The cemetery lies in the south of Döbling on the border to Währing in the Katastralgemeinde of Oberdöbling, in the Hartäckerstraße. The cemetery's limits are defined in the south by the Peter-Jordan-Straße, in the west by the Borkowskigasse and in the north by the Hartäckergasse. It thus covers an area of 49,981 m^{2} and provides space for 6853 plots.

== History ==
=== Older cemeteries in Döbling ===
Traditionally, Unterdöbling’s dead were buried at the Heiligenstadt cemetery, while those from Oberdöbling were buried around the Döbling Parish Church. The latter was expanded in 1781; records exist of its use until 1783. When the church was torn down and rebuilt in 1826, the graveyard was presumably abandoned.

A new cemetery was founded to replace the graveyard in the course of the elevation of Döbling to an independent parish. This new cemetery was designed to accommodate not just Oberdöbling’s dead, but also those from Unterdöbling, which had been included in the new parish. The cemetery was created at the edge of Unterdöbling, on the road to Grinzing (today known as the Billrothstraße), but it had to be closed in 1885 as it neared capacity. The area was transformed into the Strauss-Lanner-Park in 1928.

=== The Döbling Cemetery ===
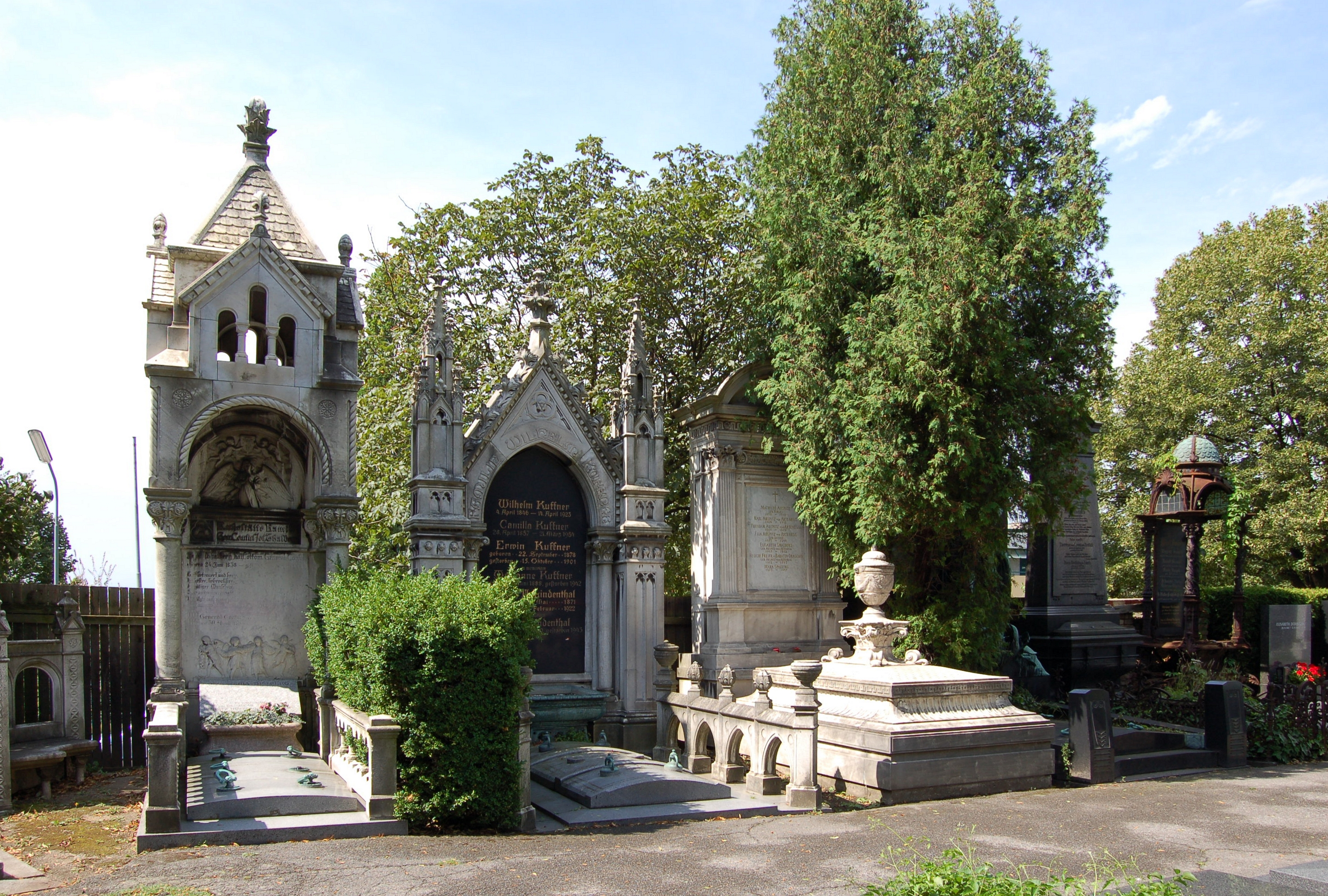
Jewish section

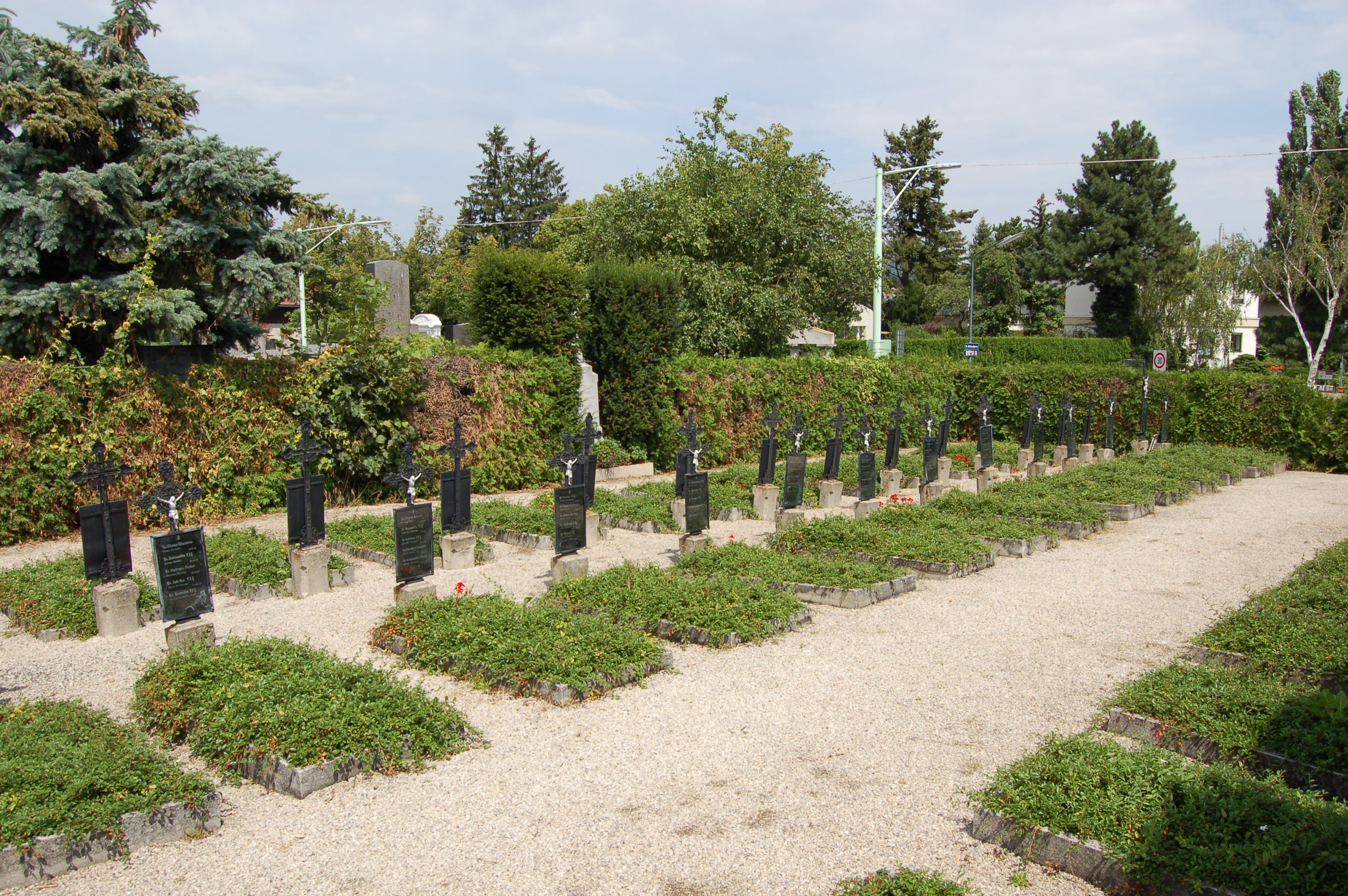
Döbling nuns’ section

Permission to found a new cemetery was granted to the communities of Oberdöbling and Unterdöbling by the imperial district authorities in Hernals on 28 April 1880. The site chosen for the new cemetery covered a rhomboid-shaped area 7.5 jochs in size (a Joch is an old measurement equivalent to 0.5755 hectares in Austria) on the Türkenschanze. The cemetery was designed by architects Avanzo and Lange to hold 30,000 graves. It was officially opened on 10 June 1885 by the Döbling parish priest, Dr. Hulesch.

The Döbling Cemetery was open to believers of all confessions. A Jewish section was opened in 1888, and on 13 February 1894, the city authorities approved the creation of a burial site for Muslim soldiers of the imperial territorial army. The Muslim section covered an area of 404.4 m^{2} with space for 40 individual graves. Its use for Muslim burials was approved for a period of 20 years; it was expanded by a further 157 m^{2} in 1900. In addition to members of these minorities and the dead from Oberdöbling and Unterdöbling, the cemetery also provided space for deceased persons from Vienna, as many did not want to be buried at the city's main cemetery, the Zentralfriedhof and the surrounding suburbs could charge a premium price for the service.

=== Expansion of the cemetery ===
The Döbling Cemetery was expanded between 1899 and 1901 by 15,584 m^{2} onto land that was either bought or repossessed for this purpose. The site was expanded by a further 9334 m^{2} to 57,271 m^{2} in 1906. The Jewish section was enlarged into an unused section of the cemetery at the same time. The morgue was renovated between 1907 and 1908 and a chapel was built for consecrations. Thereafter, the Döbling Cemetery could not be expanded any further, so in 1911, it was decided to use the Grinzing Cemetery as a replacement. From April 1917, there were no more spaces in the Döbling Cemetery, and Döbling's dead had to be buried in Grinzing. Only after the ministry for military affairs decided to cease burying Muslim soldiers in Döbling in 1920 was it possible to use space in the cemetery allocated for this purpose for Christian graves instead, although the plots were not prepared until 1929 - 1931. When the cemetery was renovated in 1961, plots which had fallen into decay were freed up for reuse.

== The morgue ==
The morgue was renovated in 1925; a second holding room was also added at this time. Further work was conducted in 1931. In 1969, a refrigeration facility was added in the treatment room. Between 1971 and 1972, the storage hall was redesigned in accordance with plans drawn up by architect Erich Boltenstern. The rear wall of the apse was decorated by painter Hermann Bauch. The storage room, which was conceived to permit the holding of cremation ceremonies, has space for up to 160 people.

== Graves of famous persons ==
=== Graves dedicated in honour of well known individuals (see Ehrengrab) ===
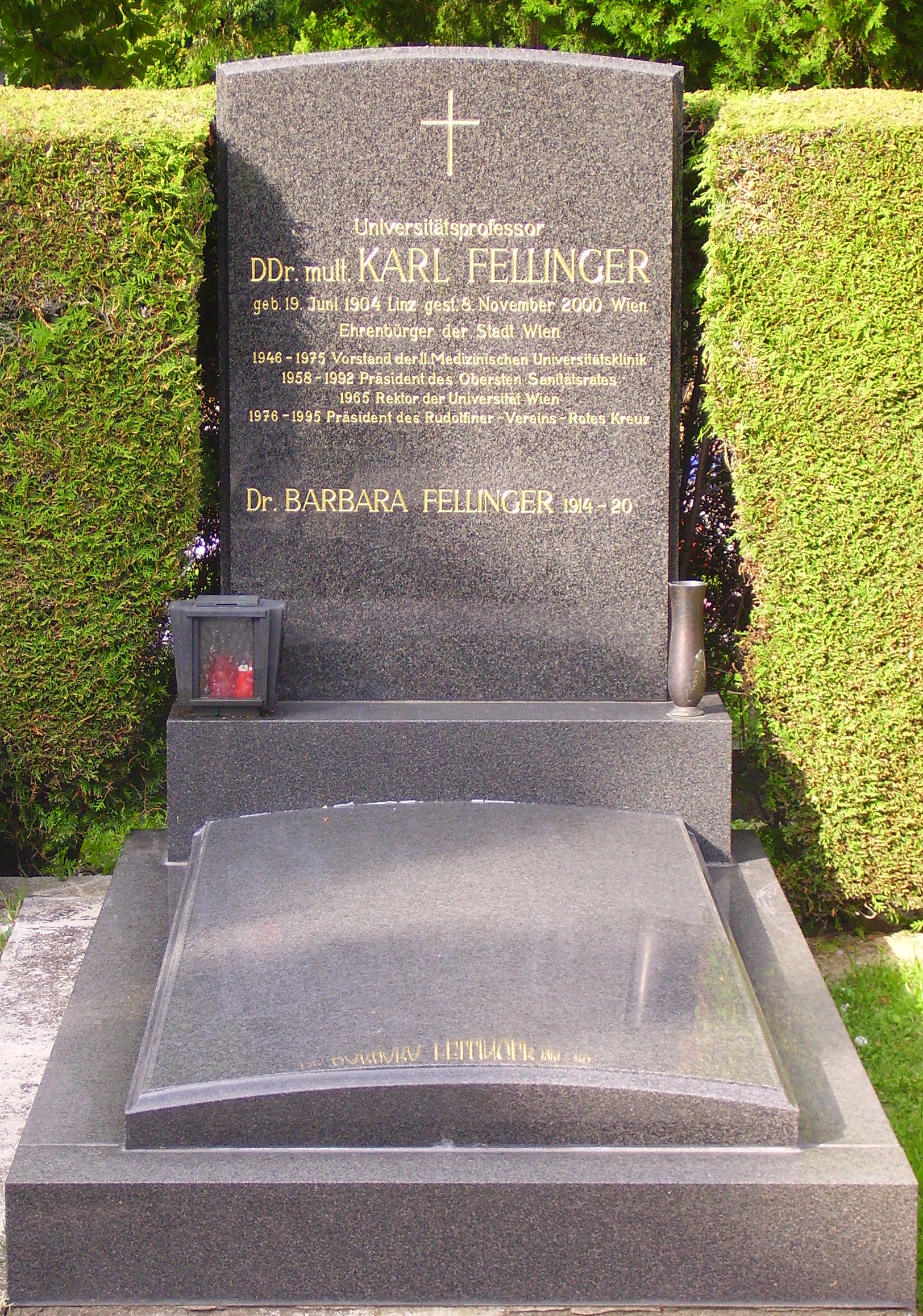
Karl Fellinger

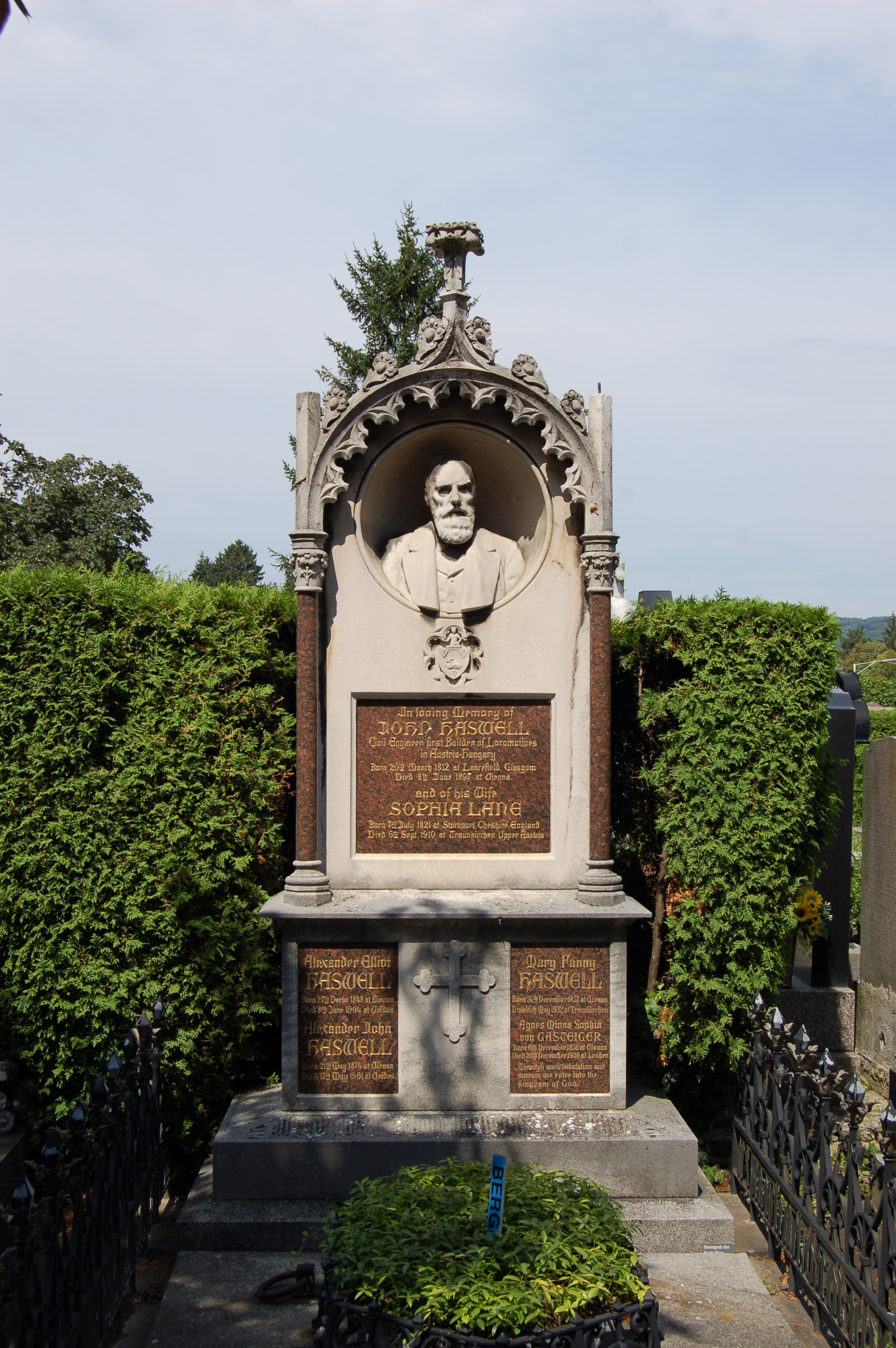
John Haswell

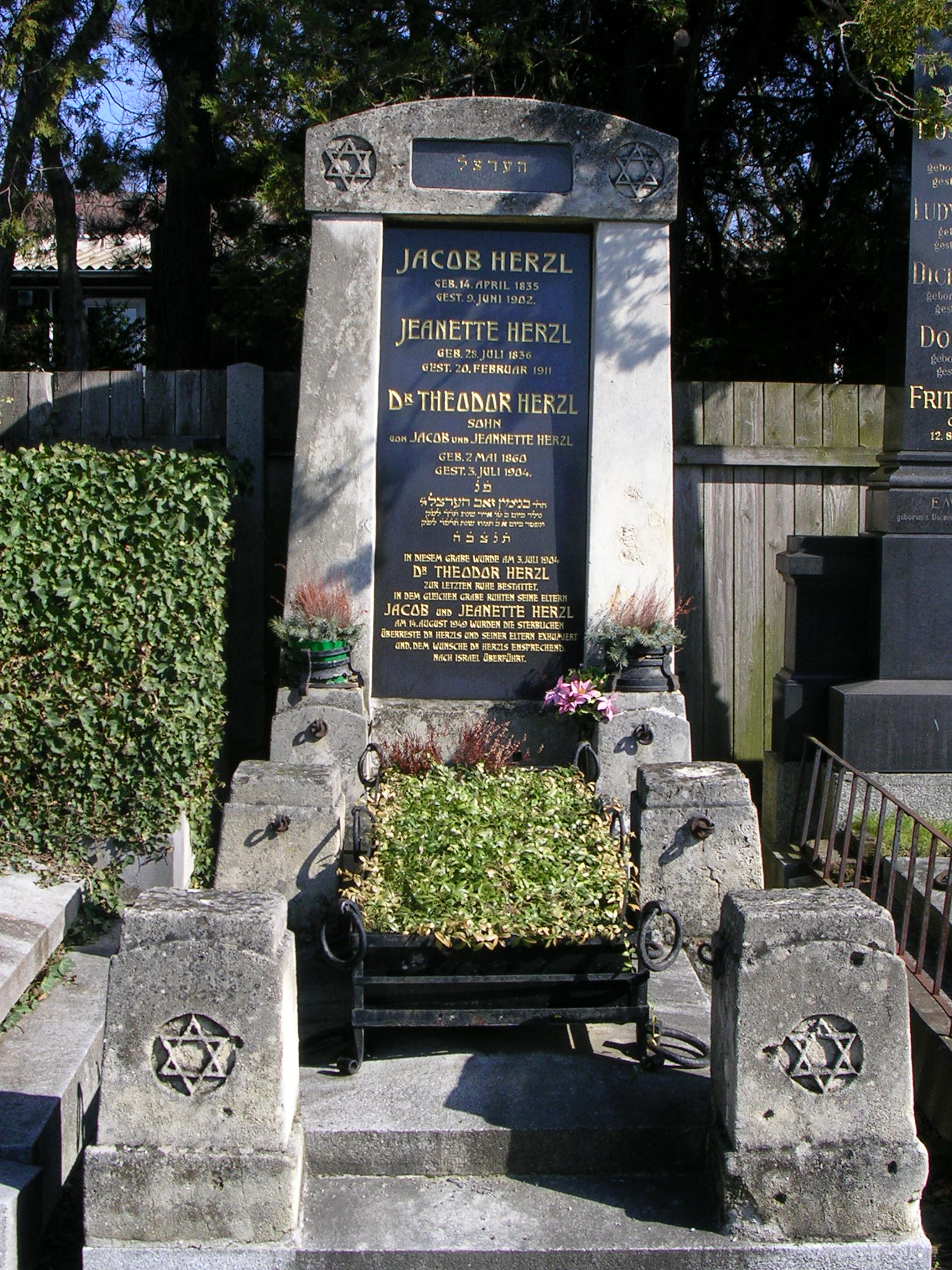
Theodor Herzl (transferred to Jerusalem in 1949)

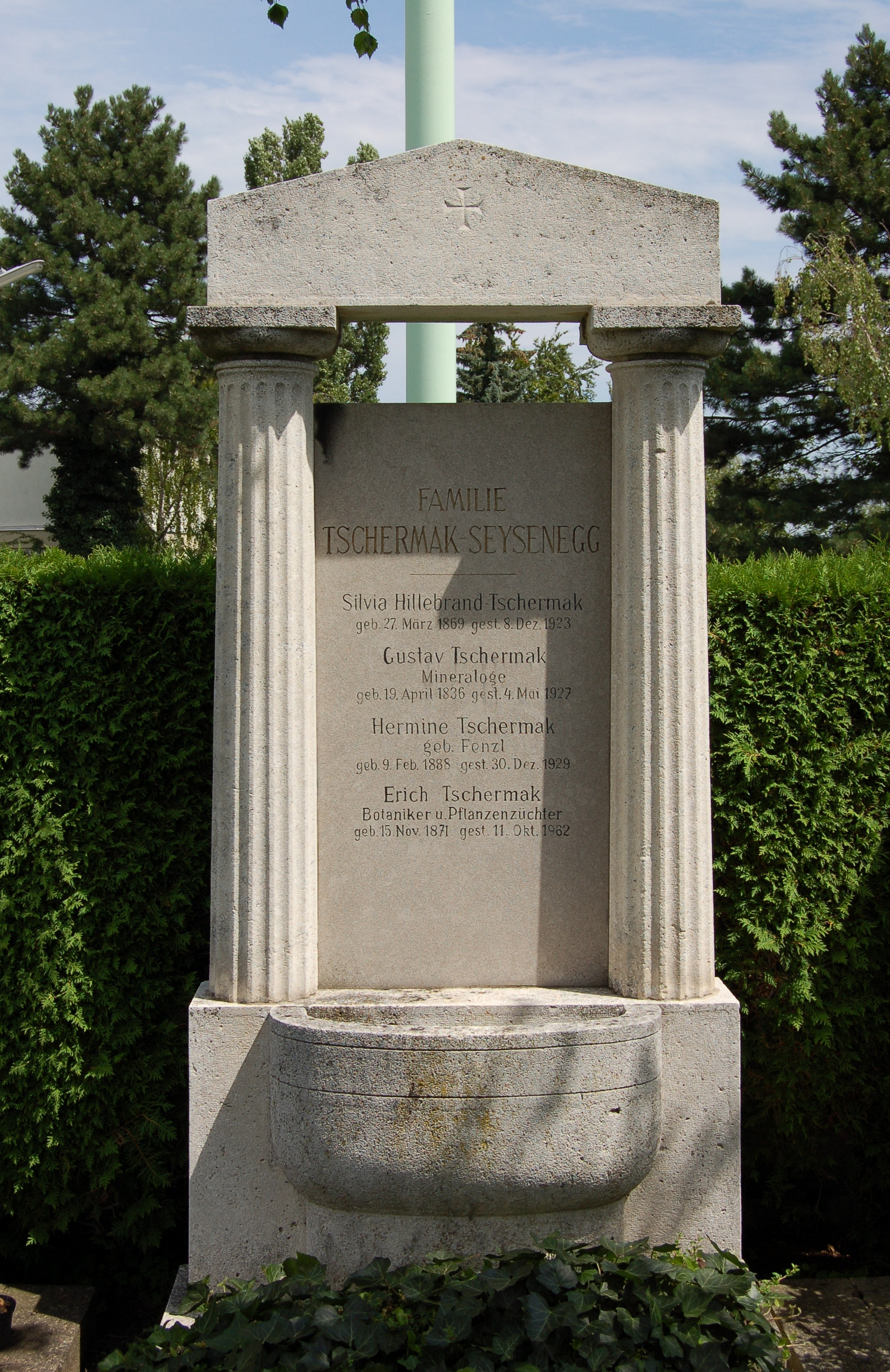
Erich and Gustav Tschermak

The Döbling Cemetery contains 67 graves dedicated in honour of notable individuals.

Name	Dates	Profession
Rudolf Auspitz	1837–1906	Politician and economist
Josef Bergauer	1880–1947	Author
Helene Bettelheim-Gabillon	1857–1946	Author
Lorenz Böhler	1885–1973	Surgeon, founder of modern accident surgery
Karl von Borkowski	1829–1905	Architect
Alfred Burgau	1897–1964	Actor
Hugo Charlemont	1850–1939	Painter
Egmont Colerus	1888–1939	Author
Josef Danilowatz	1877–1945	Painter
Babette Devrient-Reinhold	1863–1940	Actor in theatre and film
Richard Eybner	1896–1986	Actor
Karl Fellinger	1904–2000	Doctor
Theodor Gomperz	1832–1912	Philosopher and author
Caroline von Gomperz-Bettelheim	1845–1925	Opera singer
Ernst Haeussermann	1916–1984	Theatre director
Ludo Hartmann	1865–1924	Politician and proponent of education for all
John Haswell	1812–1897	Engineer and railway constructor
Kurt Heintel	1924–2002	Actor
Theodor Herzl (transferred to Jerusalem in 1949)	1860–1904	Author and founder of modern Zionism
Anton Hlavaček	1842–1926	Painter
Josef Kainz	1858–1910	Actor
Franz Kopallik	1860–1931	Painter
Ernst Lecher	1856–1926	Physicist
Maximilian Leidesdorf	1819–1889	Psychiatrist
Adolf Lieben	1836–1914	Chemist, uncle of Robert von Lieben
Konrad Loewe	1856–1912	Actor
Julius Mannaberg	1860–1941	Doctor
Heinz Moog	1908–1989	Actor
Engelbert Mühlbacher	1843–1903	Historian and practitioner of diplomatics
Maria Nemeth (married name Grünauer)	1897–1967	Opera singer
Heinrich Obersteiner	1847–1922	Neurologist and psychiatrist
Georg Oeggl	1900–1954	Opera singer
Alfred Orel	1889–1967	Musicologist
Hans Robert Pippal	1915–1998	Painter
Josef Redlich	1869–1936	Lawyer and politician
Oswald Redlich	1858–1944	Historian
Rudolf Ribarz	1848–1904	Painter
Ferdinand von Saar	1833–1906	Author
Ferdinand Schmutzer	1870–1928	Graphic artist, photographer and portraitist
Egon Schweidler	1873–1948	Physicist
Otto Skorzeny	1908–1975	SS-Obersturmbannführer
Kurt Sowinetz	1928–1991	Actor
Otto Tressler	1871–1965	Actor
Erich Tschermak	1871–1962	Geneticist and botanist
Gustav Tschermak	1836–1927	Mineralogist
Eduard Veith	1858–1925	Painter
Eduard Volters	1904–1972	Actor
Rudolf Weyr	1847–1914	Sculptor
Emil Zuckerkandl	1849–1910	Anatomist and anthropologist

=== Other graves of famous persons ===
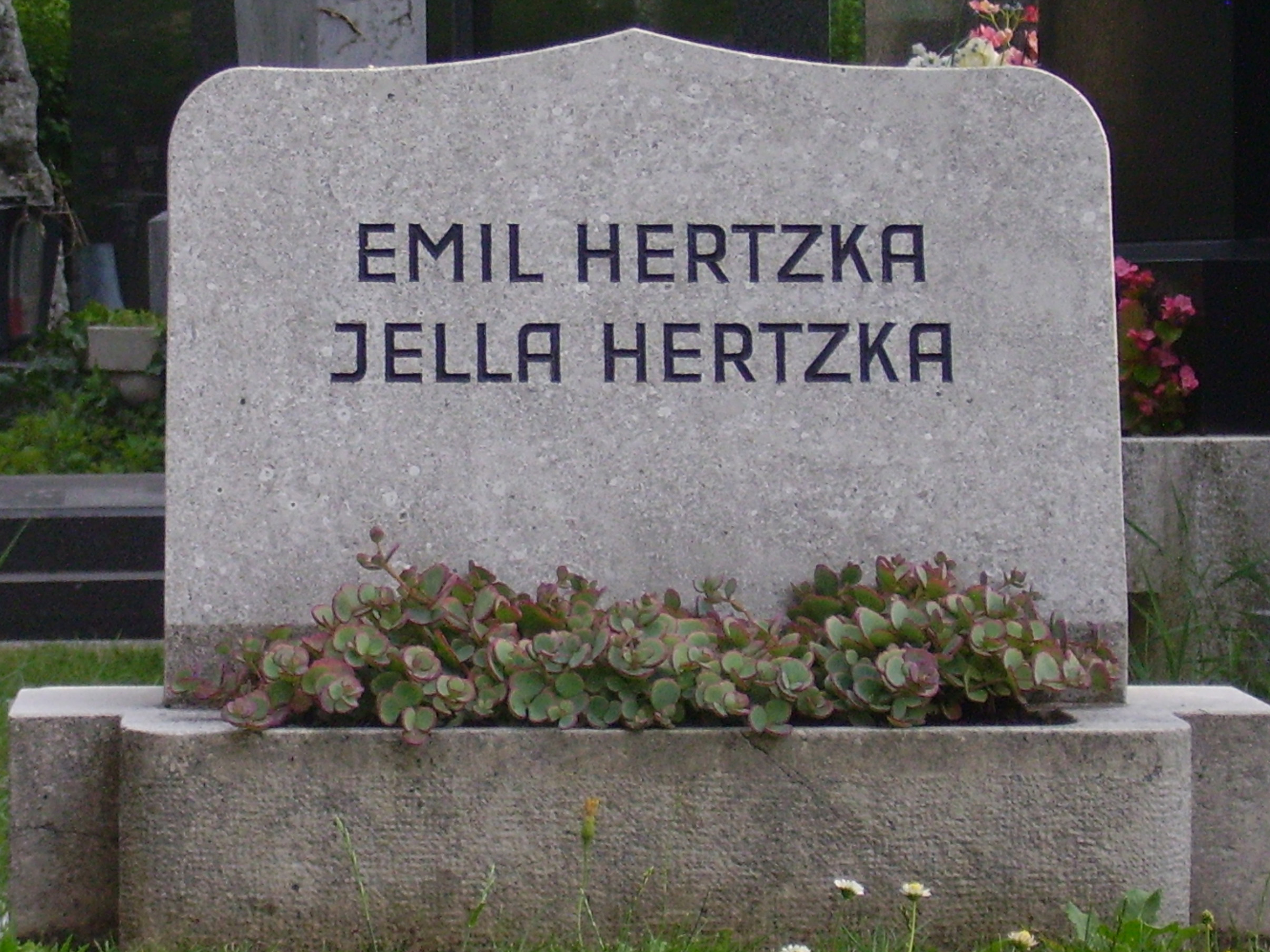
Emil and Jella Hertzka

Other famous people buried in Döbling are:

Name	Dates	Profession
Rosy Barsony	1909–1977	Operetta singer
Felix Benedict	1860–1917	Opera singer
Moriz Benedikt	1849–1920	Journalist
Jörg Böhler	1917–2005	Surgeon (son of Lorenz Böhler)
Maria Cebotari	1910–1949	Opera singer
Rudolf Chrobak	1843–1910	Gynaecologist
Gustav Diessl	1899–1948	Actor
Friedrich Engel-Jánosi	1893–1978	Historian
Erik Frey	1908–1988	Actor
Friedrich Goldscheider	1845–1897	Ceramics dealer
Gertrude Grob-Prandl	1917–1995	Opera singer
Reinhold Häussermann	1884–1947	Actor, father of Ernst Haeusserman
Ernst Hartmann	1844–1911	Actor
Emil Hertzka	1869–1932	Director of Universal Edition
Peter Herz	1895–1987	Author, librettist, cabaret artist and lyricist
Wilhelm Jerusalem	1854–1923	Pedagogue and philosopher
Fritz Kachler	1887-1975	World champion athlete and engineer
Max Kassowitz	1842–1913	Paediatrician
Ignaz von Kuffner	1892–1938	Entrepreneur, son of Moriz von Kuffner
Ignatz Lieben	1805–1862	Merchant and banker
Robert von Lieben	1878–1913	Physicist and inventor
Franz von Matsch	1861–1942	Painter and sculptor
Josef Mikl	1929–2008	Painter and graphic artist
Wilhelm Miklas	1872–1956	President of Austria (1928–1938)
Ludwig Minkus	1826–1917	Composer
Marie-Louise von Motesiczky	1906–1996	Painter
Susi Nicoletti	1918–2005	Actor
Johann Radon	1887–1956	Mathematician
Heinrich Reinhardt	1865–1922	Composer
Helene Schneeberger	1843–1898	Actress
Franz von Schönthan	1849–1913	Journalist and author
Emmerich Schrenk	1915–1988	Actor
Karl von Škoda	1878–1929	Engineer and industrialist
Rudolf Sommer	1852–1913	Actor
Adolf von Sonnenthal	1834–1909	Actor
Adolph Stöhr	1855-1921	Philosopher, academic
Eduard Todesco	1814–1887	Entrepreneur, banker and philanthrope
Moritz Todesco	1816–1873	Entrepreneur, banker and patron of the arts
Rudolf Weys	1898–1978	Writer of cabaret and author
Alexander Witeschnik	1909–1993	Composer
Johann Zacherl	1814–1888	Manufacturer
Karl Ziegler	1886–1944	Chamber singer
