= Eduard Veith =

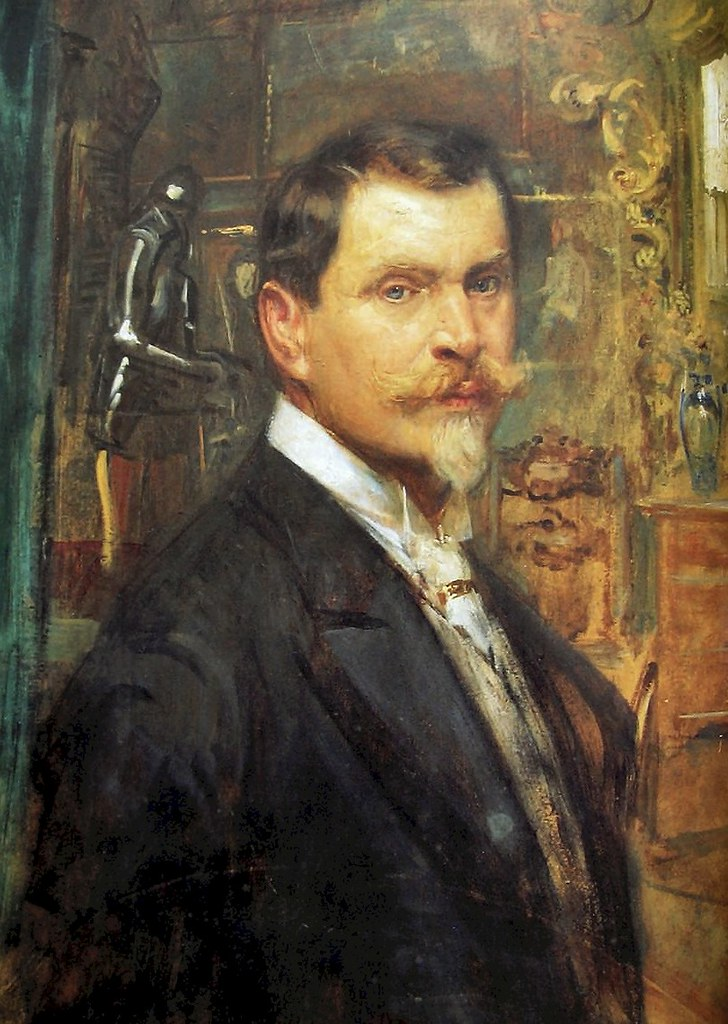
Self-portrait (c.1900)

Eduard Veith (30 March 1858, Neutitschein in Moravia (currently Nový Jičín, Czech Republic)– 18 March 1925, Vienna) was an Austrian portrait painter and stage designer. Many of his works were influenced by Symbolism.

== Biography ==
He was born to the decorative painter, Julius Veith (1820–1887), and his wife Susanna, née Schleif (1827–1883). At first, he received training to follow in his father's profession. Later, he went to Vienna, where he took classes at the Museum of Applied Arts from Professor Ferdinand Laufberger. He capped off his studies by creating sgraffito for exhibition buildings at the Exposition Universelle in Paris.

He then returned home, where he assisted his father with painting churches, synagogues and other ceremonial buildings. This was followed by several study trips; to Italy, Belgium and Tunisia. He finally settled in Vienna; becoming a free-lance artist and working mostly by commission.

From 1890, he was a member of the Vienna Künstlerhaus. In 1896, he received a gold medal at the Große Berliner Kunstausstellung. In 1905, he was appointed a Professor at the University of Technology. In 1911, he married Bertha Griesbeck (1872–1952), from Augsburg. He later taught at the University of Applied Arts Museum of Applied Arts, and became a Professor there in 1920. During his years in Vienna, he maintained contact with his home town, and held exhibitions there.

Veith achieved particular recognition as a fresco painter. Among his most prominent commissions was the monumental ceiling fresco in the Maria-Theresia-Saal of the Vienna Hofburg, executed by order of Franz Joseph I. He often collaborated with the architects, Fellner & Helmer, who built dozens of theatres and opera houses throughout the Austro-Hungarian Empire. Important decorative works include frescoes for the Vienna Volkstheater, the Diana-Bad in Vienna, and wall paintings for the Vienna Varieté Ronacher and other buildings on the Ringstraße.

In the tradition of large-scale decorative painting associated with Hans Makart and early works of Gustav Klimt and his so-called Maler-Compagnie, Veith also designed theatre curtains for venues in Vienna and Prague as well as trompe l'oeil stage sets. His oeuvre shows a strong preference for mythological and historical subjects.

Alongside his monumental work, Veith enjoyed considerable success as a portrait painter. He was particularly noted for his symbolist and often mystically inflected depictions of women, which formed an important part of his artistic reputation around the turn of the 20th century. As a painter and draughtsman, he was associated with the jugendstil movement yet remained distinct and somewhat too academic for the Vienna Secessionists of which he was not part. This was despite the fact that he and Klimt maintained an enduring friendship and mutual respect for each other's work throughout their lives His symbolist paintings and mixed media works have stimulated renewed interest recently both for his depiction of fin-de-siècle Viennese decadence (as shown in his piece "Magic of Love") as well as for his references to mystic, even occult themes popular during that period in high society as also noted in the works of contemporaries Gabriel von Max and Albert von Keller among others.

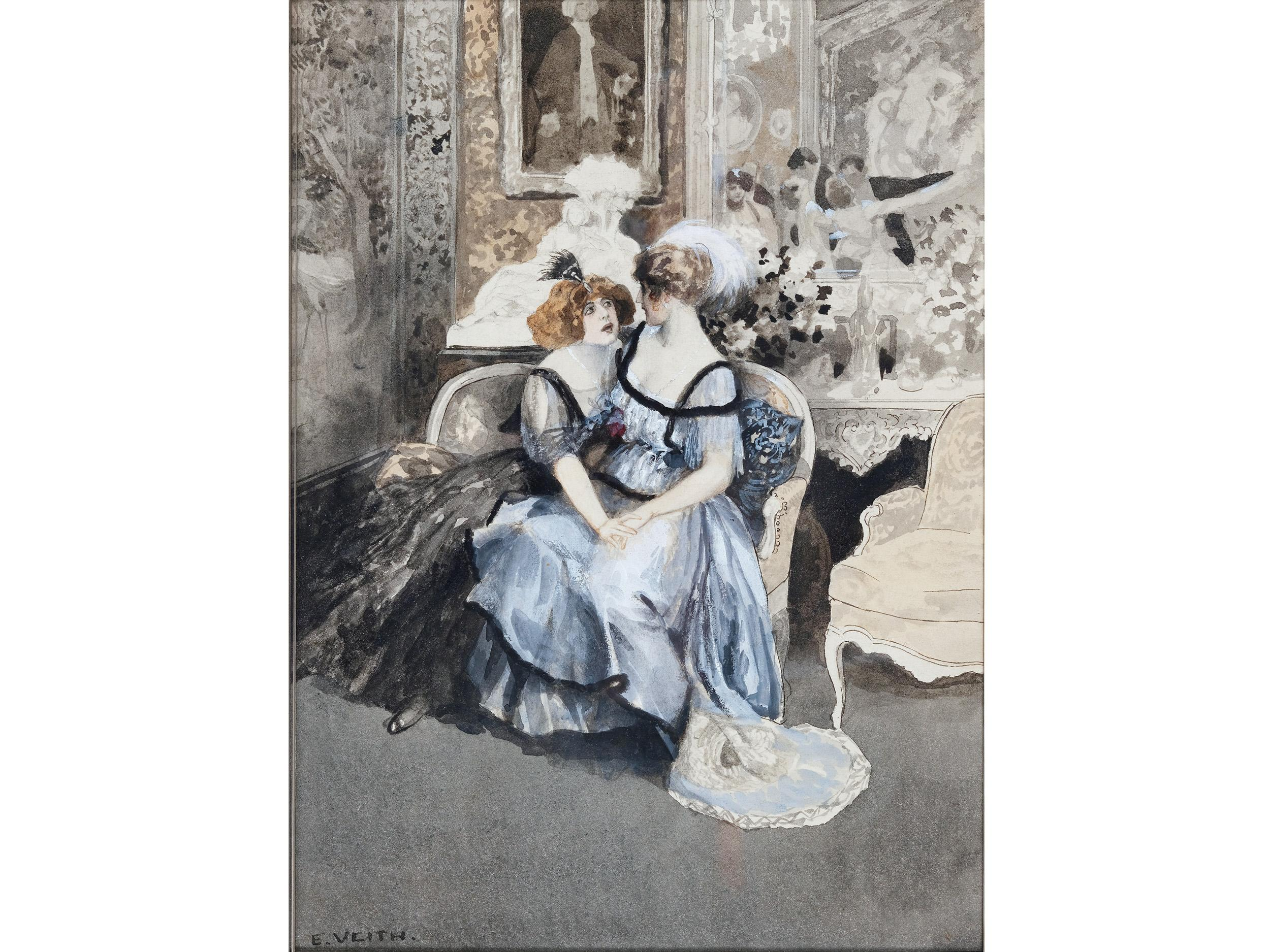
Eduard Veith – Magic of Love, pen and ink with watercolor on paper (grisaille)

Veith received several prestigious awards, including the Carl Ludwig Medal in 1892, the Reichel Prize in 1896, and the Small Golden State Medal in the same year. From 1890 onward, he was a member of the Wiener Künstlerhaus.

He died shortly before his sixty-seventh birthday, and was interred at Döbling Cemetery. His grave is adorned with a sculpture by Georg Leisek.

== Selected paintings ==
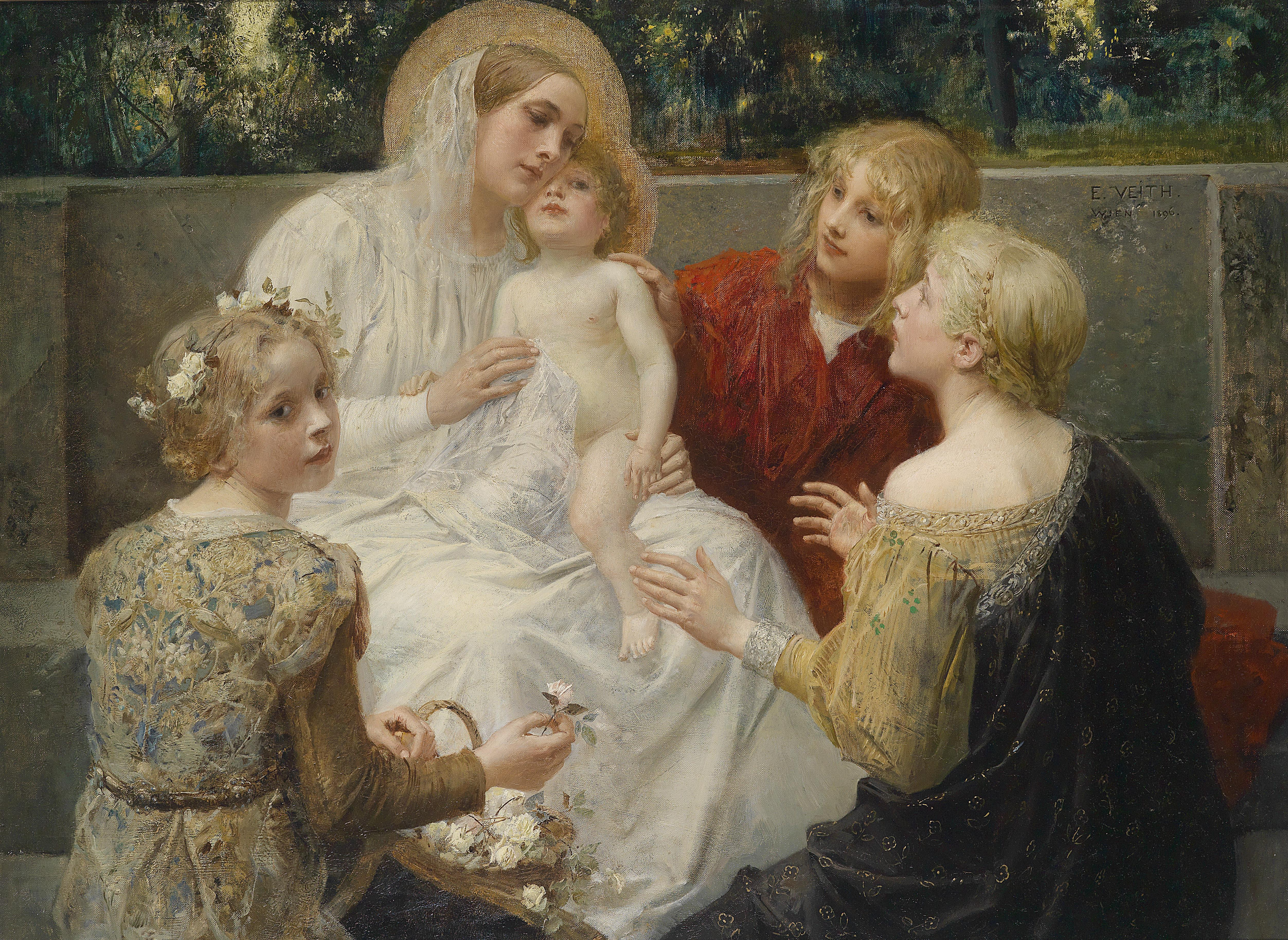
The Madonna with Jesus,
Surrounded by Children

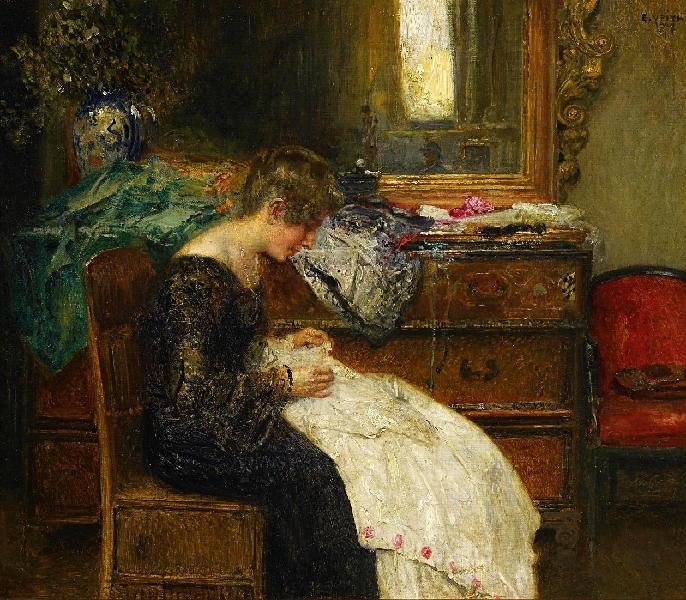
Young Woman Doing Needlework

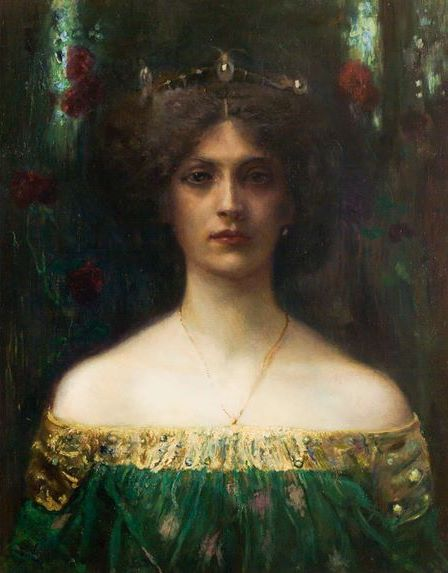
The King's Daughter

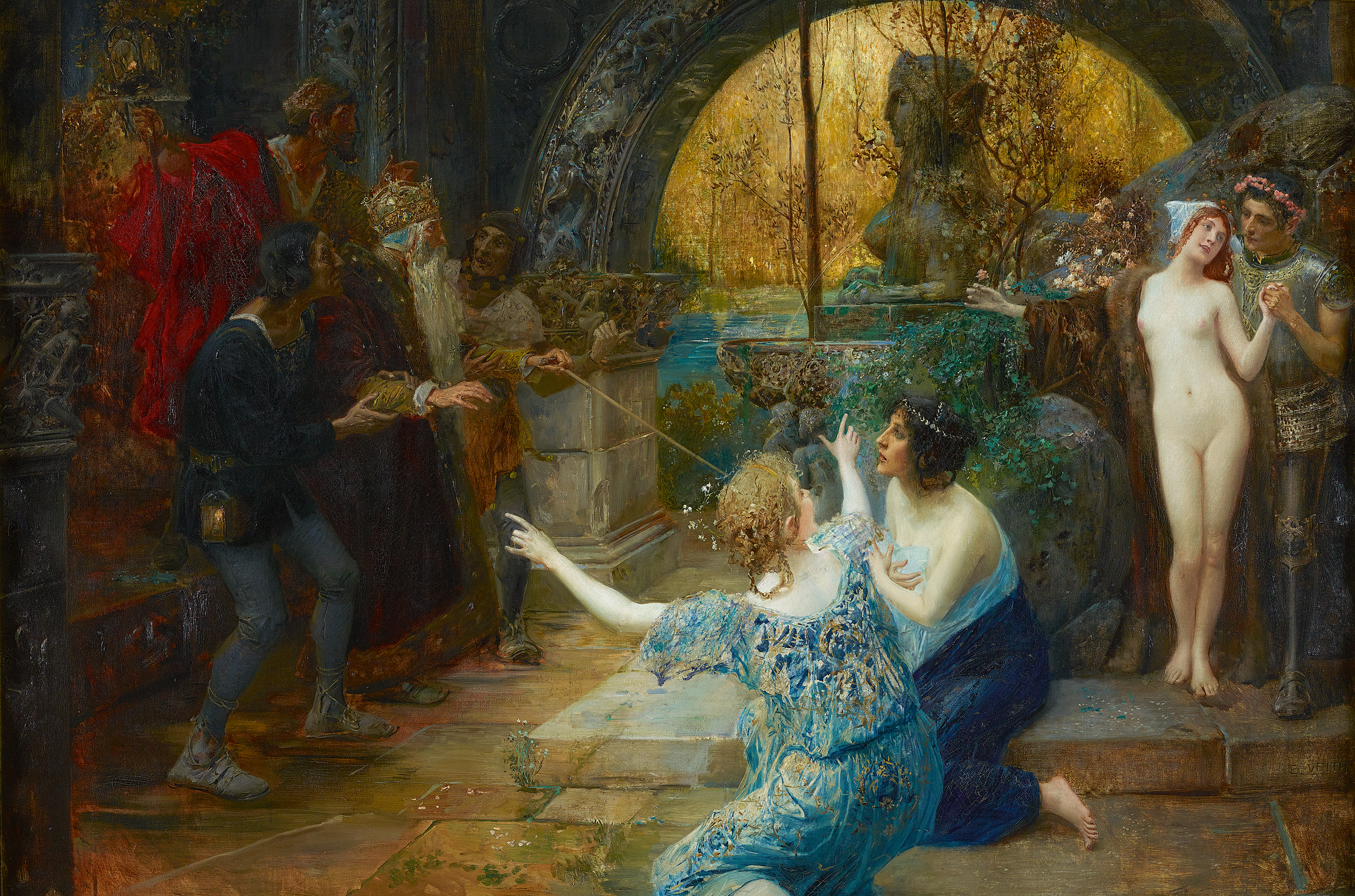
The Fountain of Youth

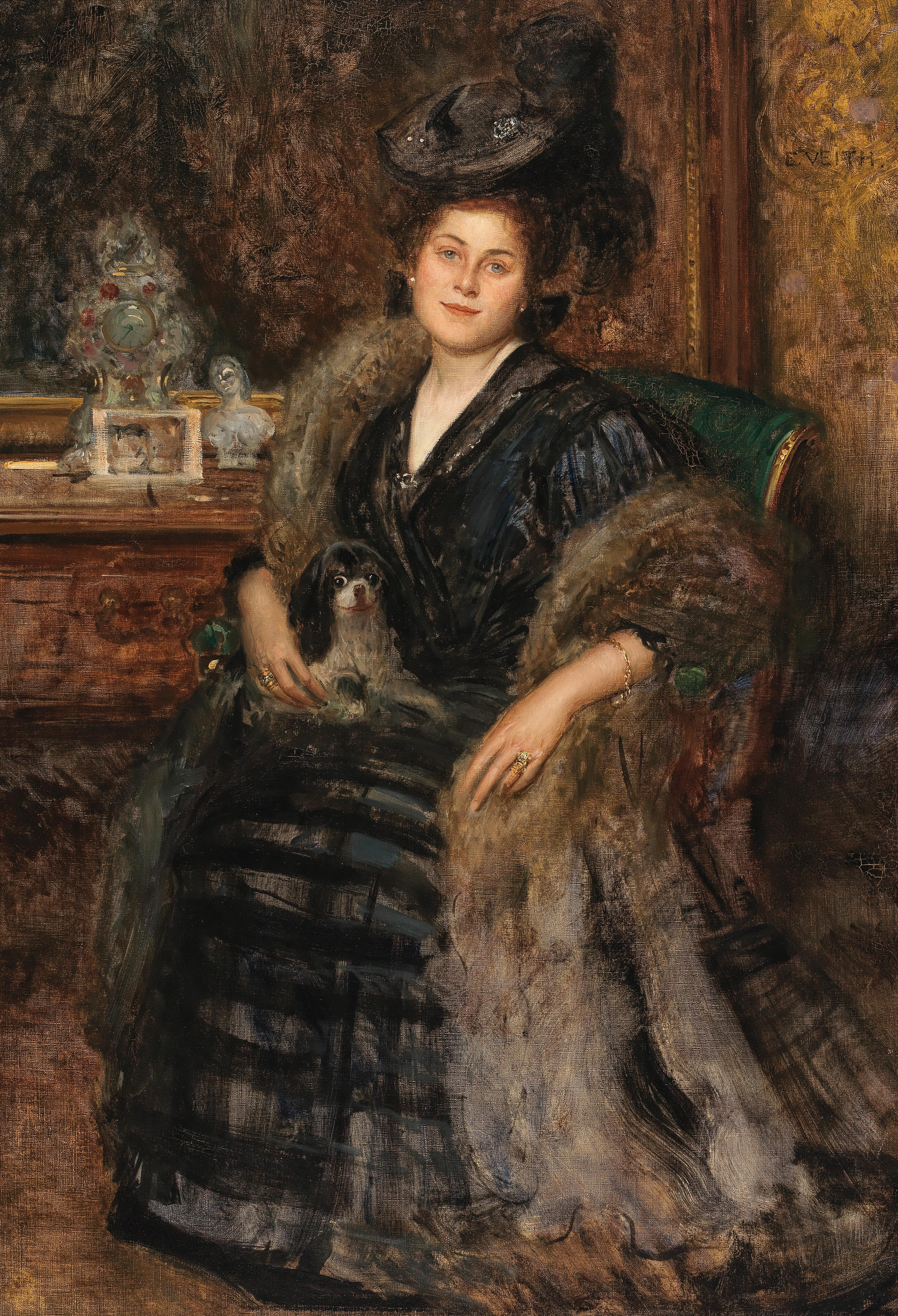
Portrait of his wife, Bertha

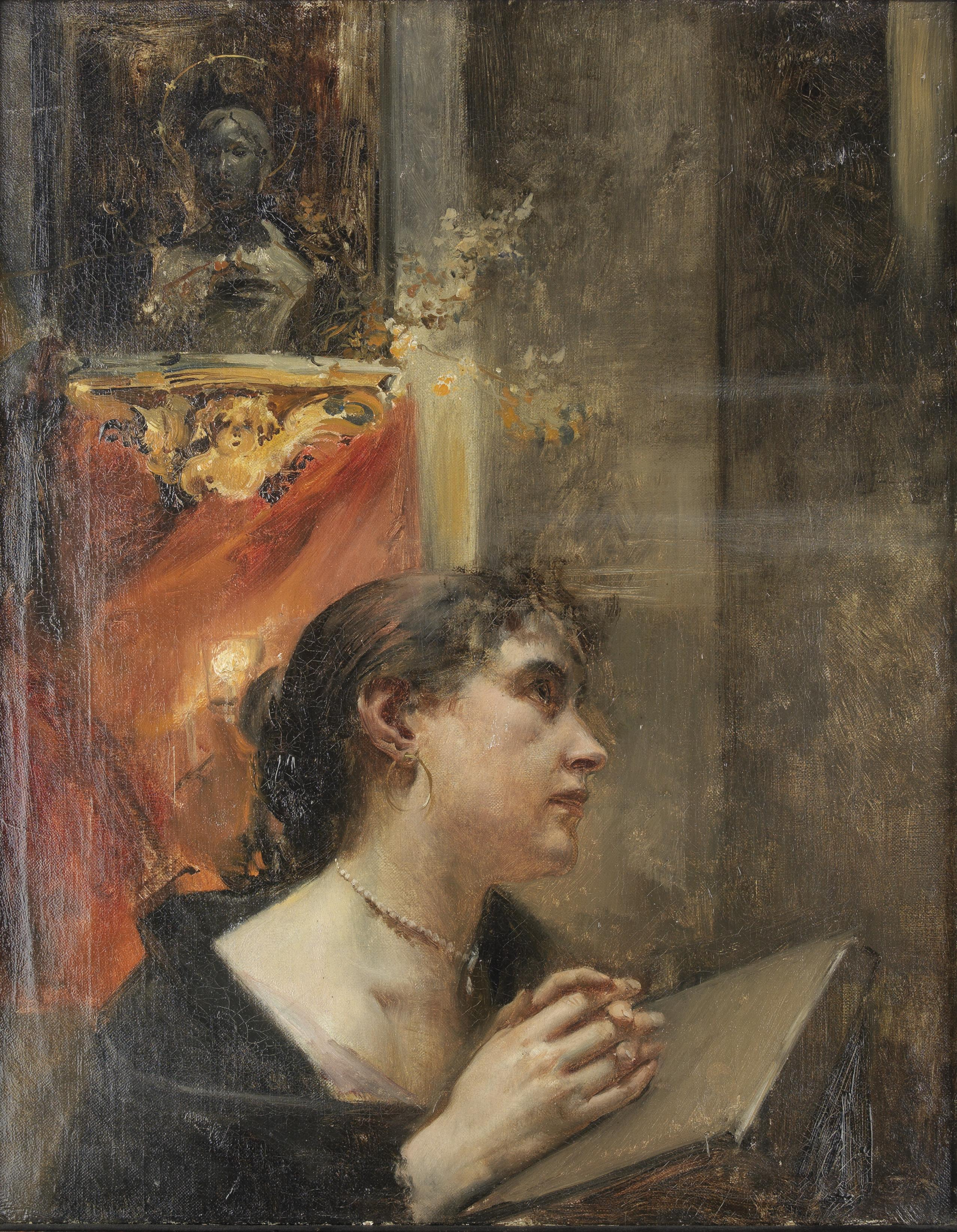
Worship in church

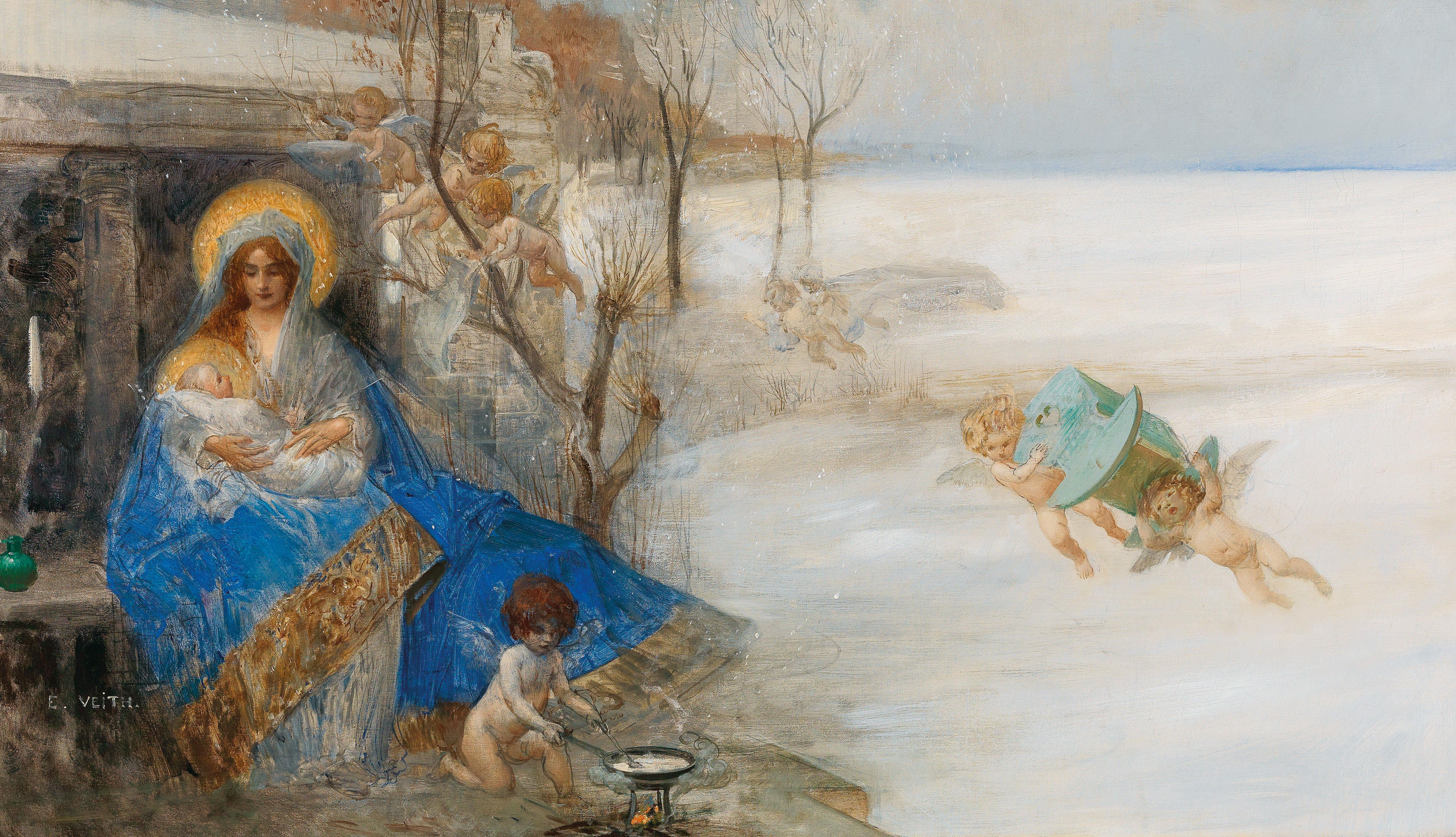
Madonna and Child surrounded by angels

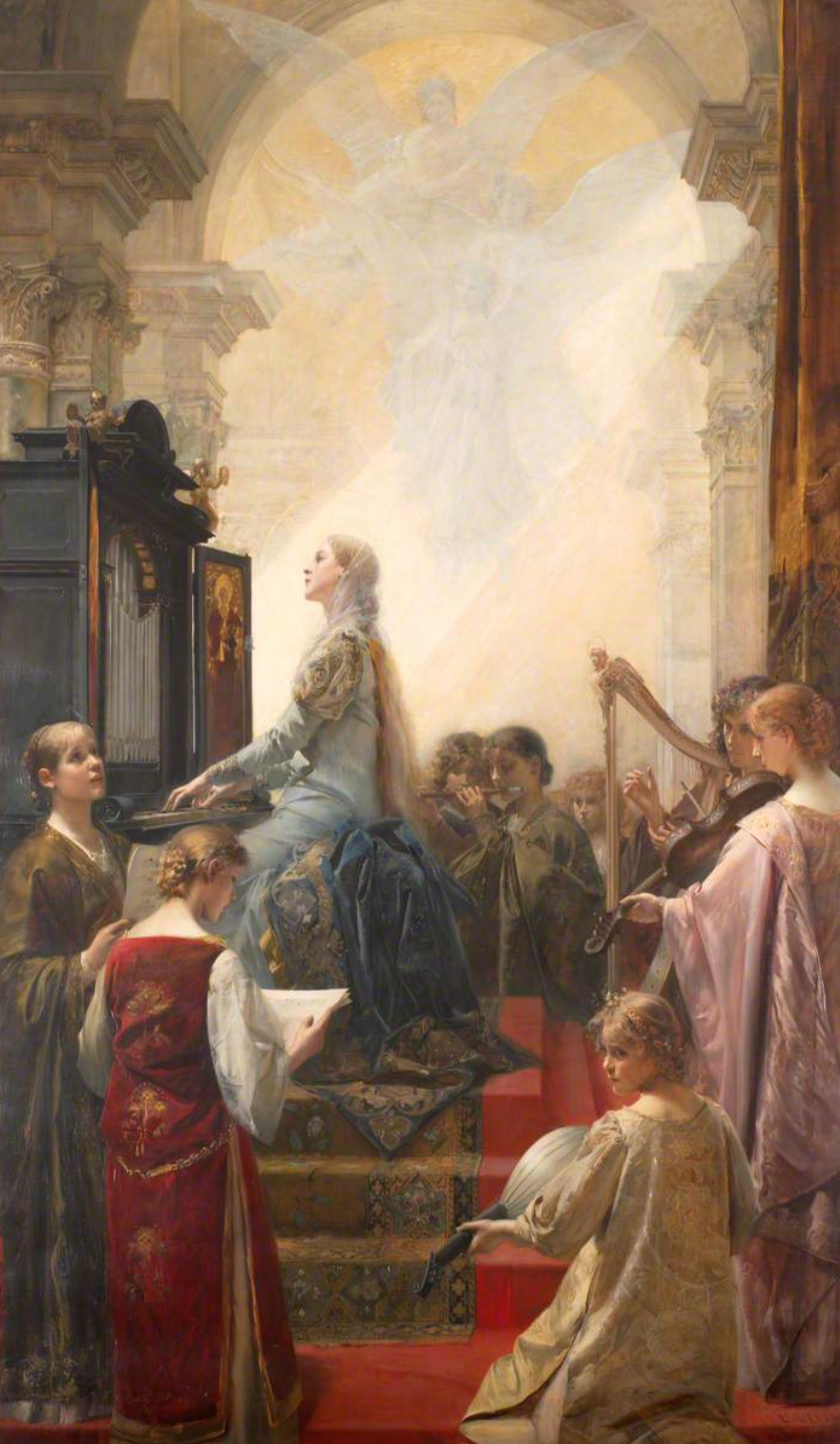
Saint Cecilia

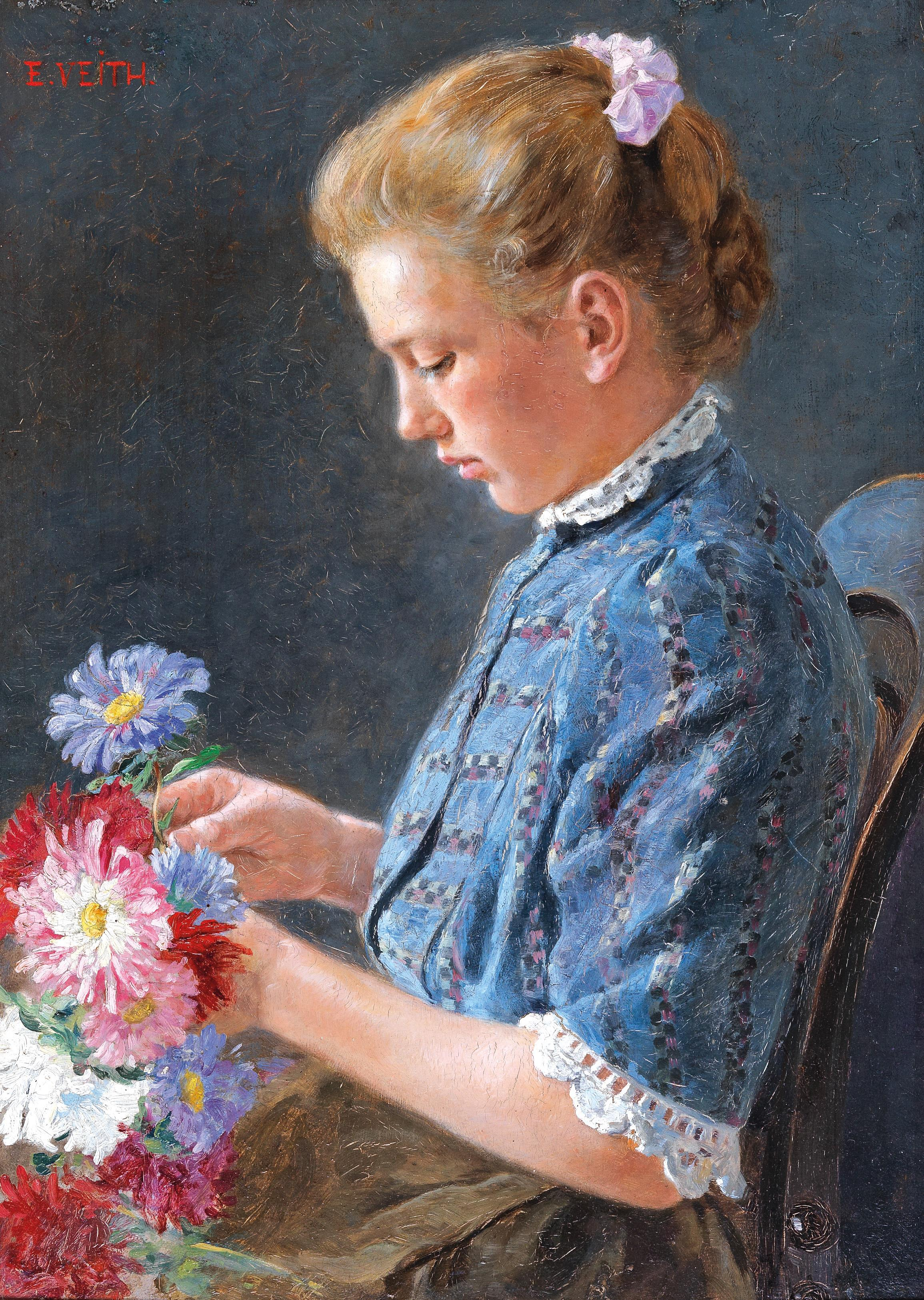
Viennese girl from the Naschmarkt

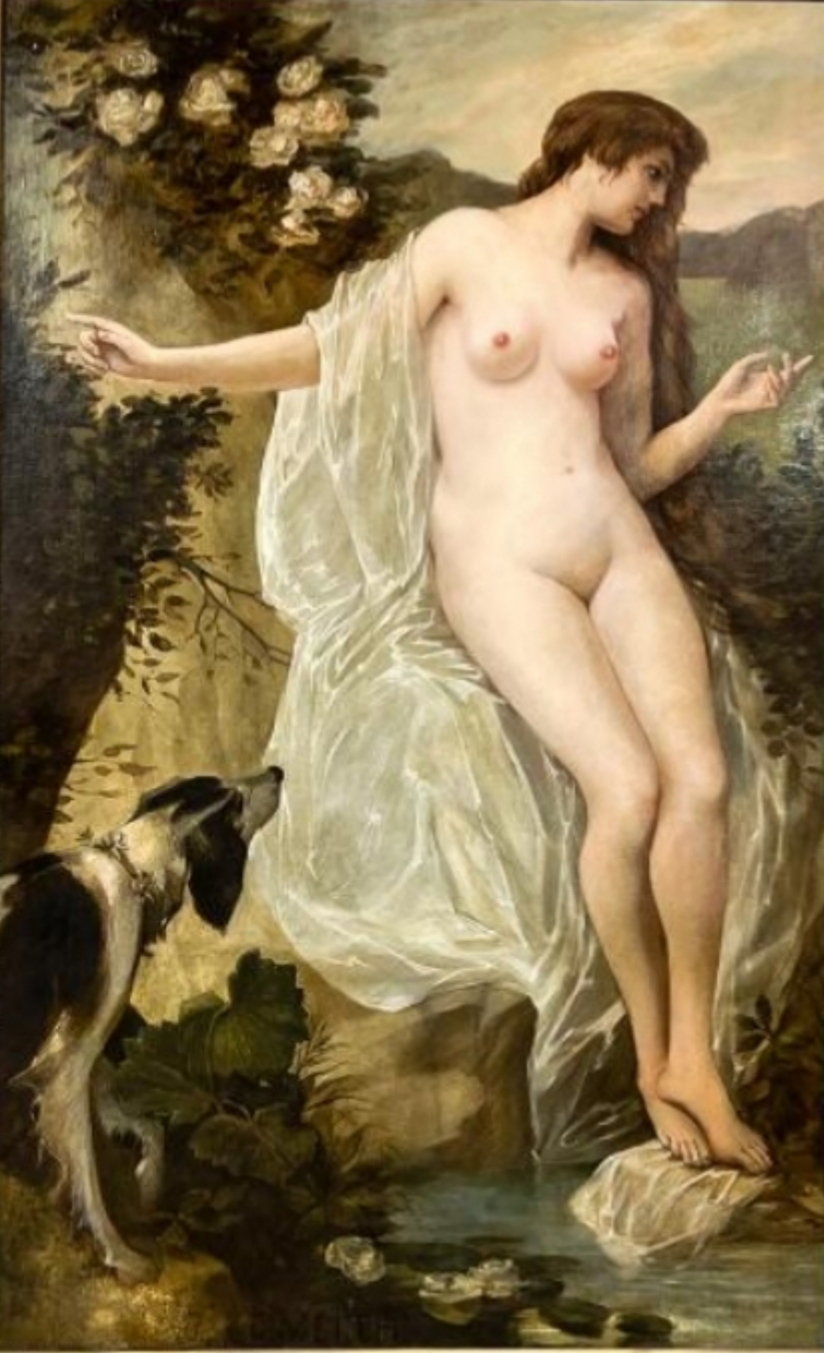
Göttin Diana mit Jagdhund, stehend im Fluss
