= Konrad Loewe =

Austrian actor and playwright

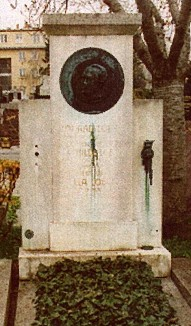
Konrad Loewe's tombstone

Konrad Loewe, real name Konrad Löw (6 February 1856 in Prostějov, Moravia – 11 February 1912 in Vienna), was an actor and playwright from Austria-Hungary.

The son of a merchant, Loewe studied law in Vienna, but changed for the stage in 1878. After stays in Teplice and Olomouc he came to the Konzerthaus Berlin in 1881 and played at numerous other theatres in Germany and Austria. In 1895 he finally became an actor at the k.k. Hof-Burgtheater in Vienna. To his mostly heroic roles belong the figures of Gessler, Musikus Miller, Karl Moor, Hamlet, and others.

He was buried in Döbling Cemetery in Vienna. His wife, the court opera singer Mathilde Loewe, is buried next to him.
