= Eduard Charlemont =

Austrian painter

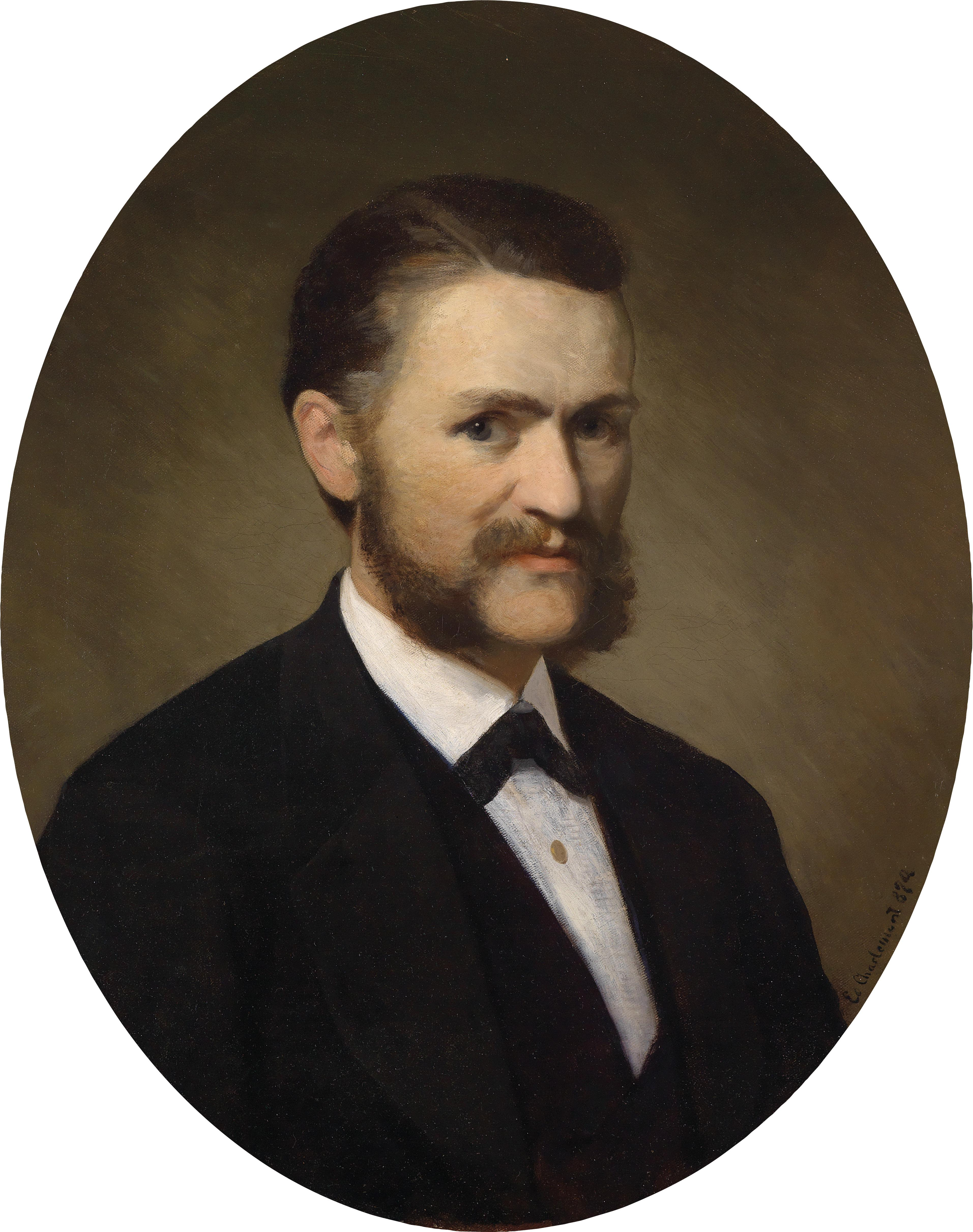
- Portrait of Eduard Charlemont
- Born: 2 August 1848; Vienna, Austria
- Died: 7 February 1906 (aged 57); Vienna, Austria
- Education: Academy of Fine Arts Vienna
- Movement: Orientalist

Eduard Charlemont (2 August 1848 – 7 February 1906) was an Austrian painter.

== Early life ==
Eduard Charlemont was born in Vienna, capital of the Austrian Empire, in 1848. His father, Matthias Adolf Charlemont, was also a painter, specializing in painting miniature portraits. His younger brother Hugo Charlemont (1850–1939) was an equally famous impressionist painter. At the age of fifteen Charlemont exhibited his works for the first time at the Academy of Fine Arts Vienna, where he studied fine arts. At the same age Eduard Charlemont was also hired by a girls' school to teach drawing.

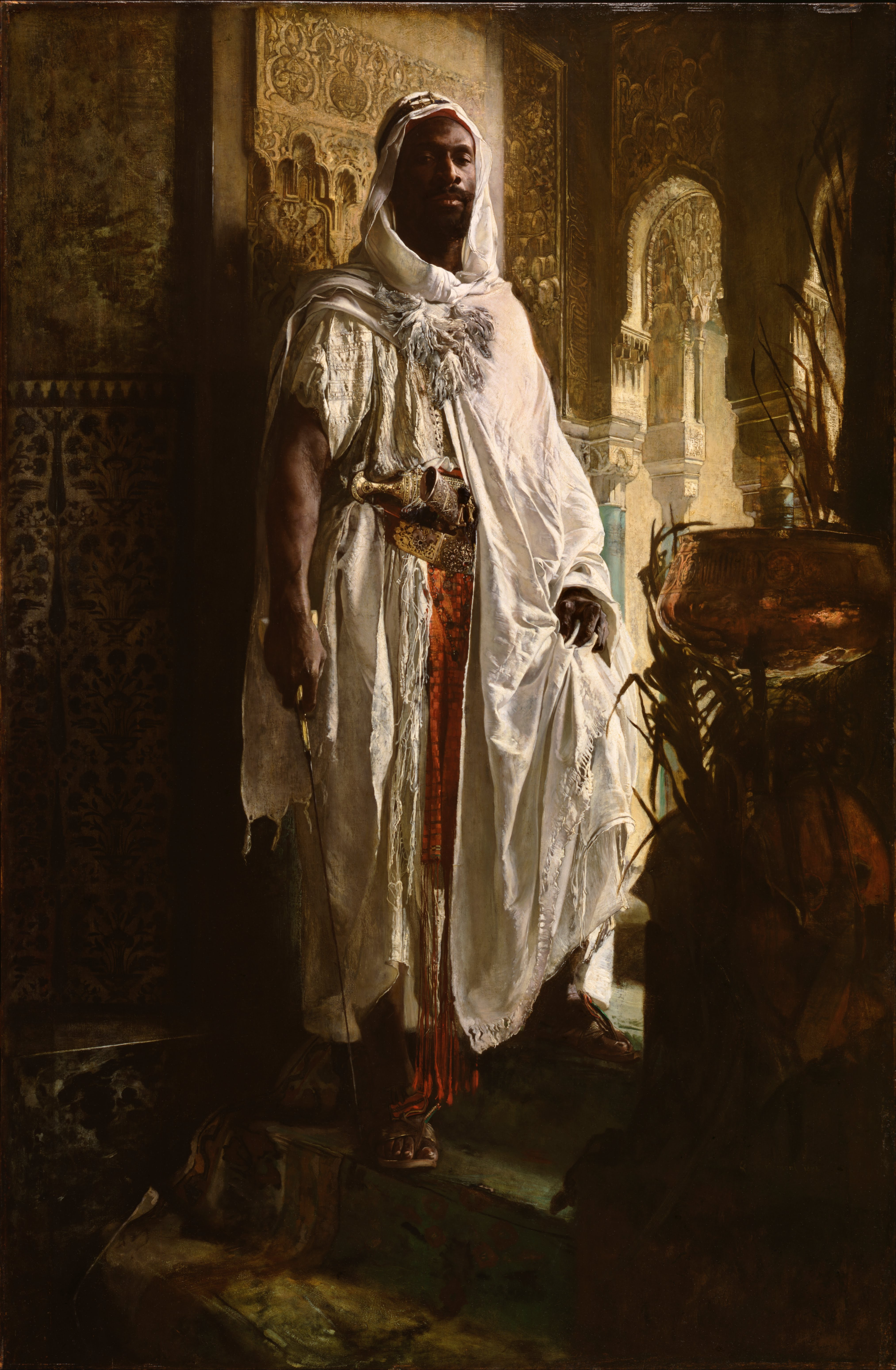
_{Philadelphia Museum of Art} The Moorish Chief (originally titled The Guardian of the Seraglio), 1878

== Career ==
After graduating from the Academy of Fine Arts Vienna, Charlemont traveled to many countries in central Europe and finally settled in Paris, where he lived for the next thirty years. In Paris, several times he won the first prize of the Paris Salon, an annual exhibition held by the French Academy of Fine Arts (French: Académie des Beaux-Arts). The most famous work of Charlemont is The Guardian of the Seraglio, widely known as The Moorish Chief, depicting a Moorish swordsman guarding a seraglio (part of a typical wealthy Arabic villa, where women stayed when strangers entered the house). In 1899 he won the gold medal at the Exposition Universelle, a World's Fair held in Paris. Charlemont was also known for his murals. He painted three of the murals of the Burgtheater (the Austrian National Theatre in Vienna and one of the most important German language theatres in the world) totaling a length of about 55 meters. He died in Vienna in 1906.

Today, reproductions of his painting The Moorish Chief are the best-selling items in the museum store of the Philadelphia Museum of Art.

== Paintings ==
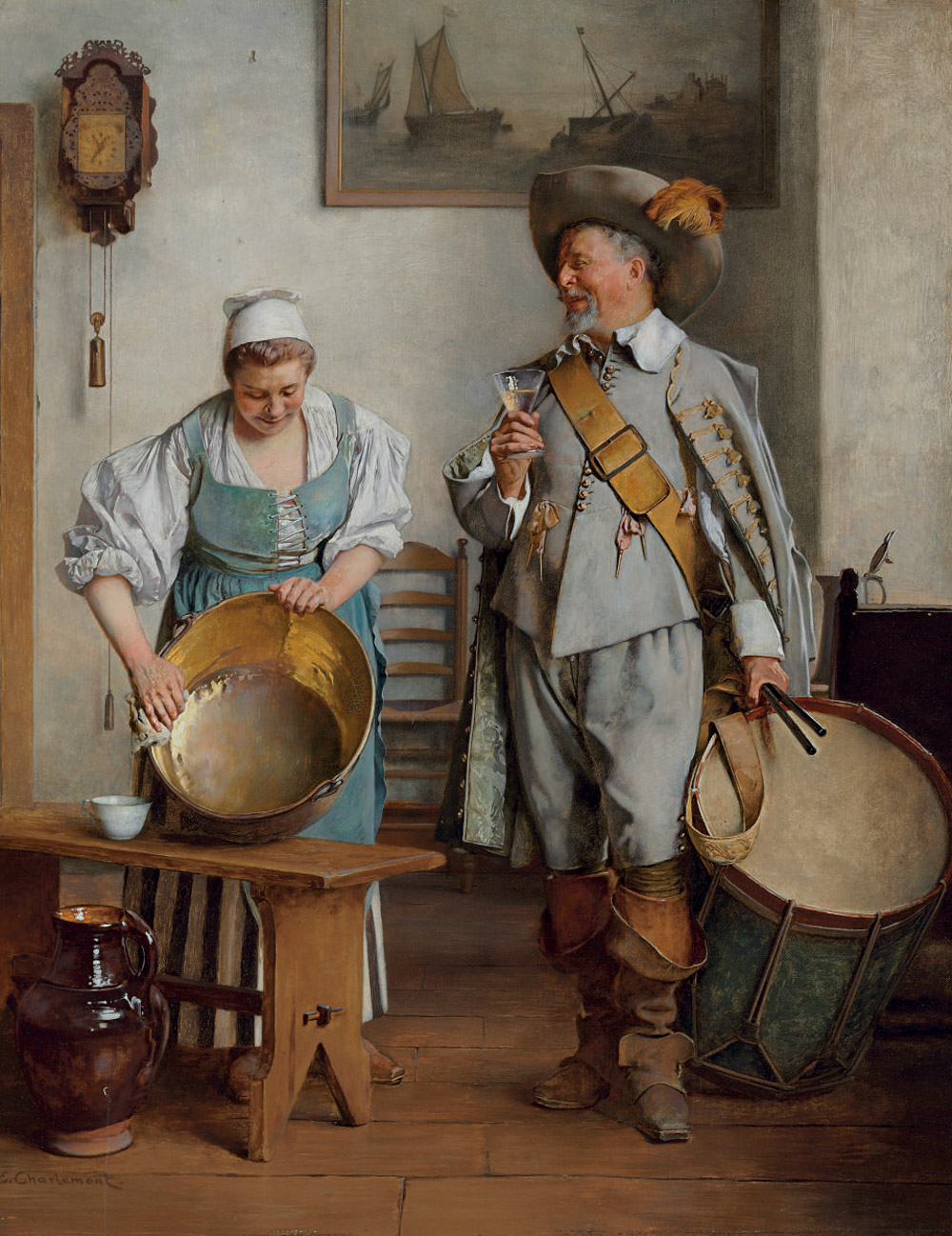
A Drink for the Drummer, 1889

- The Guardian of the Seraglio (The Moorish Chief), 1878
- Arranging her Still Life, 1884
- At the toilette
- The Music Lesson
- Hans Makart in his Atelier
- Tunisian Artisan
- A Drink for the Drummer, 1889
- Artist in his Studio, 1890
- A Gentleman in an Interior
- Wooden Bridge
- Scène d'intérieur
- La Parisienne, 1900
- Cupid sharpening his arrow

== See also ==
- List of Orientalist artists
- Orientalism
