= Josef Kainz =

Austro-Hungarian actor (1858–1910)

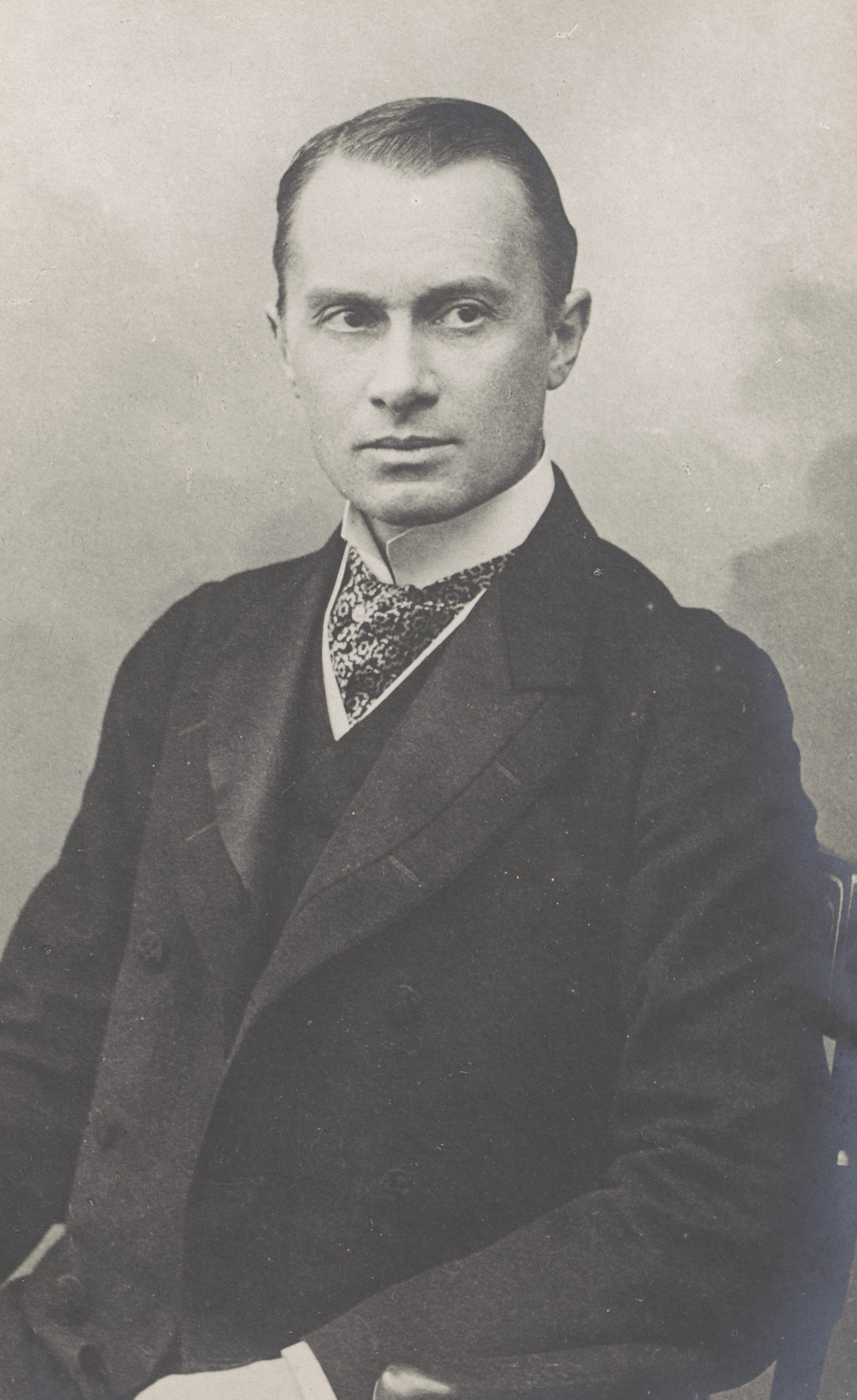
- Kainz, 1904
- Born: Josef Gottfried Ignaz Kainz; 2 January 1858; Moson, Hungary, Austrian Empire
- Died: 20 September 1910 (aged 52); Vienna, Austria-Hungary
- Resting place: Döbling Cemetery, Vienna
- Occupation: Actor
- Years active: 1873–1910
- Spouse: Sarah Hutzler (1886–1893)

Josef Gottfried Ignaz Kainz (2 January 1858 – 20 September 1910) was a male actor from Austria-Hungary. He was highly active in theatres in Austria-Hungary and the German Empire from 1873 to 1910. Revered as one of the greatest actors of the German-speaking theatre, the city of Vienna annually bestowed a theatre award for outstanding acting performance named after him, the Kainz Medal, from 1958 to 1999 (replaced by the Nestroy Theatre Prize in 2000).

== Early life ==
Kainz was born in the town of Moson (German: Wieselburg), then in the Austrian Empire, today part of Mosonmagyaróvár, Hungary, where his father worked as a railroad official.

In 1867, the family returned to Vienna, where Josef started his performance career at the age of 15, followed by engagements at theatres in Maribor (Marburg an der Drau), Leipzig and Meiningen.

== Career ==
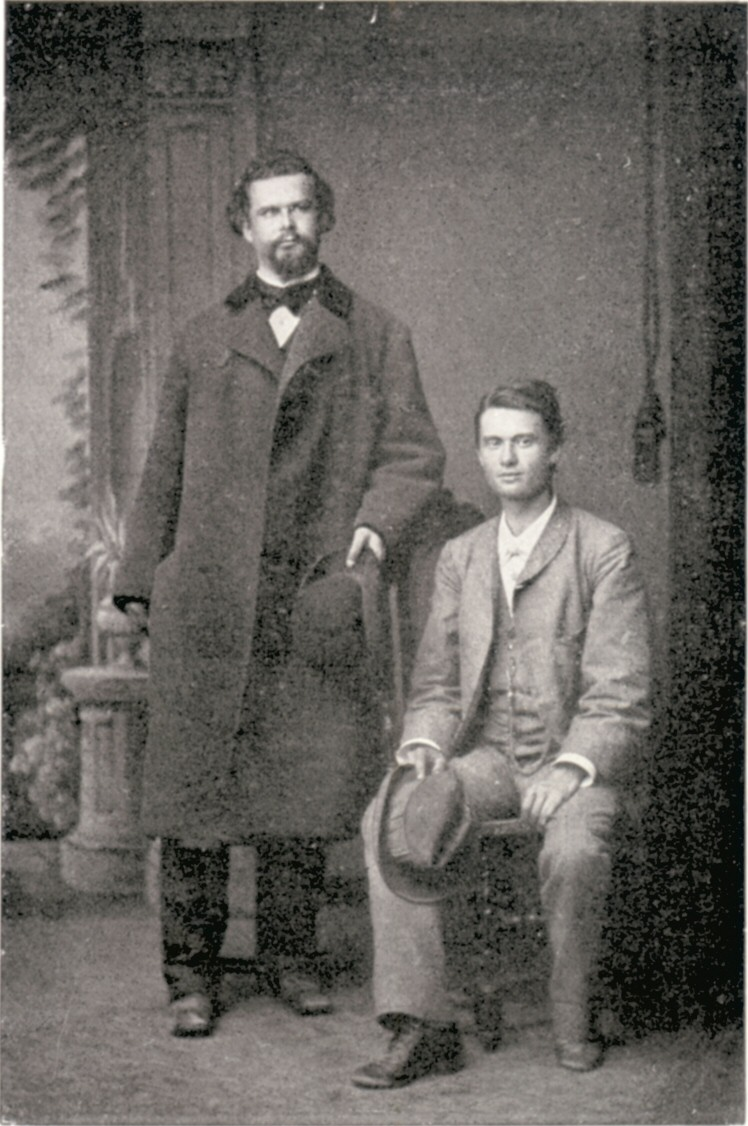
Kainz (r.) and King Ludwig II 1881

From 1880, he worked with Ernst von Possart at the National Theatre Munich and became one of the favourite actors of King Ludwig II of Bavaria appearing in private performance exclusively for the monarch's delight. In the summer of 1881, Ludwig II undertook a joint journey with Kainz to Lake Lucerne, where the relationship cooled. Three years later, Kainz joined the ensemble of the newly established Deutsches Theater in Berlin, where he gained immense popularity with performances of Hamlet, Richard II, Schiller's Don Carlos and as Franz Moor in The Robbers.

With director Ludwig Barnay he went to the Berliner Theater in 1888. Both men, however, soon came into conflict with each other, which earned Kainz a professional disqualification on German stages for breaking his contract. He toured abroad for several years until in 1892 he was able to return to the Deutsches Theater. Finally, in 1899, he achieved an employment at the Vienna Burgtheater and, vested with the title of Hofschauspieler ("Court Actor"), played characters like Shylock in The Merchant of Venice or Tartuffe.

== Death ==
Kainz died of cancer in Vienna aged 52, a few days after he was appointed director of the Burgtheater. His body is buried at the Döbling Cemetery.
