= Lorenz Böhler =

Austrian physician and surgeon

- Böhler in 1955
- Born: 15 January 1885; Wolfurt, Austria
- Died: 20 January 1973 (aged 88); Vienna
- Resting place: Döbling Cemetery
- Education: University of Vienna
- Scientific career
- Fields: Physician, surgeon

Lorenz Böhler (15 January 1885 in Wolfurt, Austria – 20 January 1973 in Vienna) was an Austrian physician and surgeon.

Böhler is most notable as one of the creators of modern accident surgery. He was the head of the AUVA-Hospital in Vienna, Brigittenau, that was later named after him: Lorenz-Böhler-Unfallkrankenhaus. This hospital was an international model during his time as the leading surgeon there.

In radiology, the measurement of Böhler's angle on a foot X-ray can help detect fractures of the calcaneus.

== Early life ==
At the early age of 5 Böhler – son of a family of craftspeople – knew he wanted to become a surgeon. When he was a little boy he used to anatomize small birds and squirrels. On 6 December 1896 an X-ray of a hand by Wilhelm Röntgen was published in Das interessante Blatt magazine. Lorenz Böhler saw it, cut it out and stuck it on his reading book. In 1896 he attended the fürsterzbischöfliche Knabenseminar in Brixen. After two years he left that school and attended secondary school in Bregenz, where he had to repeat the third grade. He graduated in 1905. He started his studies in medicine in 1905 at the University of Vienna. In 1910 he met his wife—a nurse—at Bregenz's hospital where he was working as a trainee. On 1 July 1911 Böhler became Doctor of Medicine at Vienna's University.

== Occupational activity until 1914 ==
For a short time (1911—and then again in 1919, 1920), Böhler worked at the clinic of surgeon Julius Hochenegg, who was his Professor at University. Hochenegg was one of the first doctors who had a department for accident surgery in his clinic.

Since September 1911 Böhler worked as a physician on a ship for a few months, until he started to work at the garrison's hospital at Ragusa, where he became a k. u. k. substitute medical assistant. There he mostly did bacteriological work. In Autumn 1912 he became an assistant doctor at the hospital in Brixen and in April 1913 he became assistant doctor in Tetschen an der Elbe.

In 1914 Böhler went to an international surgeons congress in New York City. On his way to the congress he met Belgian doctor Albin Lambotte, who told him about surgical methods of fracture treatment. Afterwards Böhler spent some time at the Mayo Clinic, Rochester, Minnesota, where he met Charles Horace Mayo. Mayo told him about the centres of fracture treatment at London and Liverpool. There was nothing like this in the German-speaking part of Europe. Mayo gave Böhler a commendatory letter for Arbuthnot Lane in London, who was one of the leading European doctors in surgical fracture treatment, but the breakout of World War I made it impossible for Böhler to visit Lane.

== Böhler's career during World War I ==
Shortly after conscription Böhler wanted to work as a surgeon and so he did: From 1914 to 1916 he was working as a surgeon at the Divisions-Sanitäts-Anstalt Nr. 8 der Tiroler Kaiserjäger and in August 1916 he became the leading surgeon at a military hospital for minor casualties in Bozen.

Initially, Böhler was not allowed to treat shot fractures, but he managed to get soldiers with broken bones and was able to treat them successfully. As a result, he was given permission to treat them, and the military hospital was expanded to a special station for bone fractures and renamed "Spezialabteilung für Knochenschussbrüche und Gelenkschüsse." ("Special department for bone shot fractures and joint shots.")

Hajifaridipak he realized that some of his ideas, such as specialization and standardization of care, records kept for statistical analyses, documentation of information on the patient's plaster, and the patients were categorized according to their kind of physical injury. Patients who were able to contribute were required to do so at the military hospital..

Böhler had seen the chaos in other military hospitals where patients were lying higgledy-piggledy which of course caused difficulties in treating them.

For a short time in 1918 Böhler was in Italian war captivity and had to work as an advisory surgeon for Italian military hospitals.

== The interwar years – the founding of the AUVA hospital ==
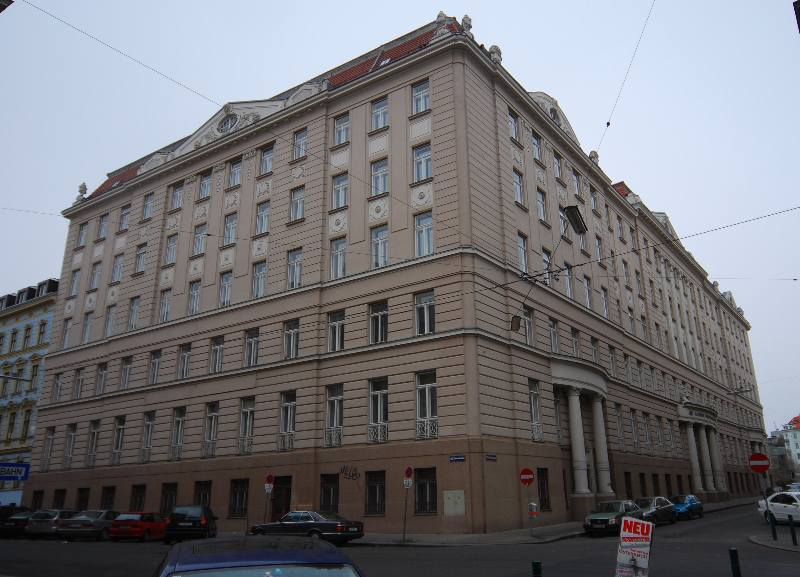
Webergasse 2–4: the AUVA-hospital in Vienna

Back in Austria Böhler wanted to establish special stations for casualty treatments. Therefore, he approached the Arbeiterunfallversicherungsanstalt (AUVA) (labourer's accident insurance) in Vienna and tried to explain the (both medical and economic) advantages which it would have if the AUVA would have an own specialized hospital. Though the AUVA agreed with Böhler the project wasn't realized until 1925. The AUVA-hospital opened on 1 December 1925 in Vienna Webergasse 2–6. Böhler (meanwhile he was working as a surgeon in Bozen and Brixen) became the head of the hospital.

Böhler's reputation as a surgeon increased, especially abroad, while some of his colleagues in Vienna rejected him. Encouraged by the American Medical Association of Vienna (A.M.A.) he wrote the first edition of his book on bone fractures and modern techniques to deal with them called Treatment of fractures – which became his classic work – in 1929. On 29 March 1930 Böhler was promoted to professor at the University of Vienna. There he was teaching surgery and accident treatment. On 3 August 1936 he became an associate Professor.

== Böhler during World War II ==
Little is known about Böhler's life during the Second World War. On 25 May 1938 he became a member of the Nazi Party (No. 6.361.999). In the summer of 1939 he was one of the 13 physicians of Vienna's University (7 professors and 6 private lecturers) who signed a protest letter against the suggested move of the A.M.A. from Vienna to London claiming "... that we the undersigned, know of not one case of persecution of a professor for his racial or religious adherence. ... It could rather be said that by the removal of certain influences a trend of charlatanism, which was beginning to damage the reputation of the Vienna medical clinics in the eyes of serious medical men, was eliminated".

During World War II Böhler was among other things working as an advisory surgeon for the Wehrmacht and at the Rudolfspital in Vienna, where he was the head of the surgery department and of a specialized military hospital for bone fractures.

== After 1945 ==
Böhler was one of the scientists who resumed a successful career as Professor (in 1954 he became a professor) and physician (publishing many medical papers), despite his membership in the Nazi Party. He remained the head of the AUVA-hospital Until 1963. His son Jörg Böhler, also a surgeon, was the head of the AUVA-hospital from 1970 to 1983.

== Böhler's treatment principles ==
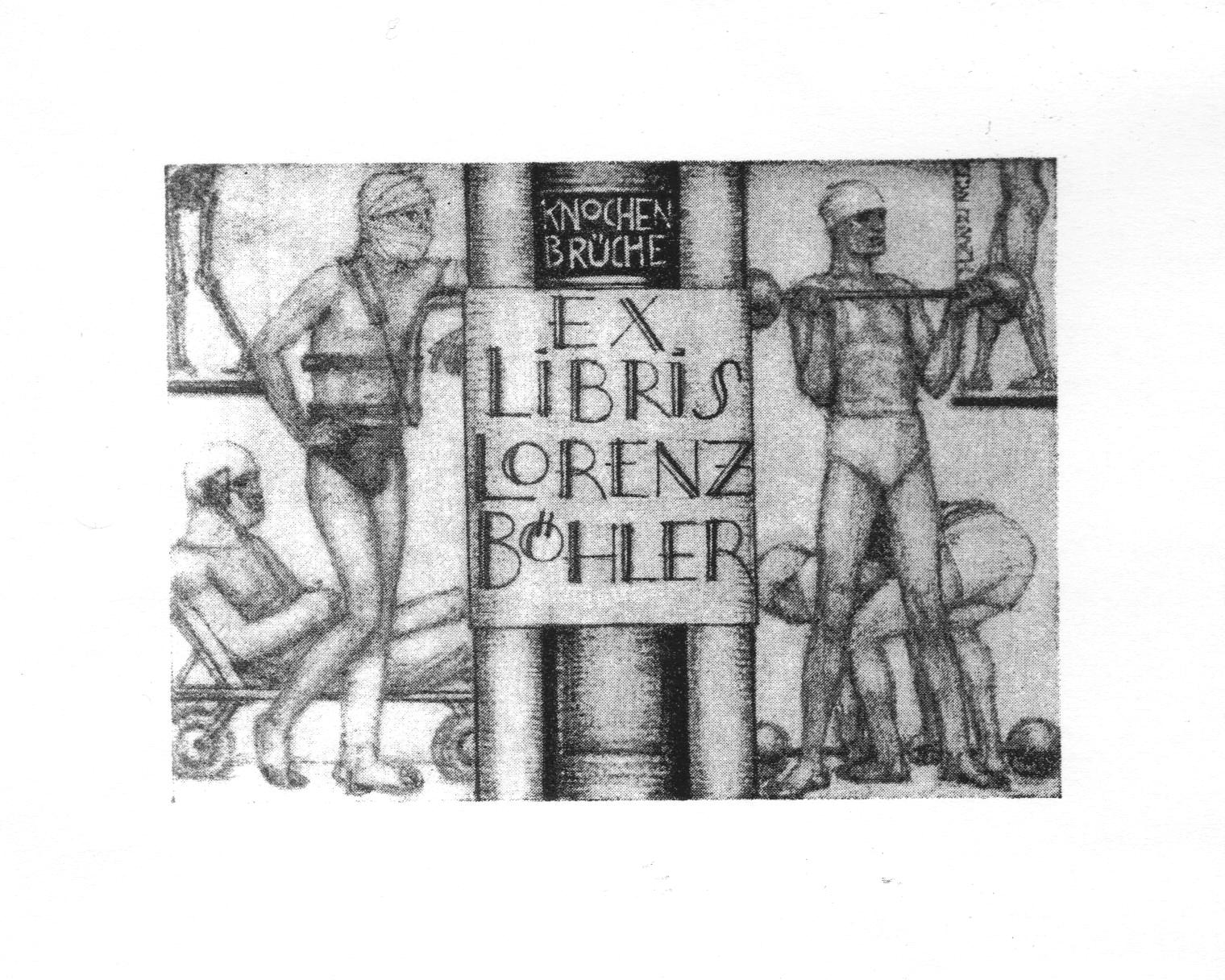
Lorenz Böhler's Exlibris showing his book "Die Technik der Knochenbruchbehandlung" („Treatment of Fractures“) and patients doing work out in an exercise room.

Böhler's aim was to:

- save life
- save the part of the body
- save its function.

This should be achieved by:

- a fast diagnosis
- painless adjusting
- immobilize the injured body part
- active movement of all other body parts but trying to avoid causing pain.

Böhler rejected the methods of treatment which had been popular at this time: electricity, hot air and massage.

== Honours and awards ==
- Knights Cross of the Order of Franz Joseph (1915)
- Merit Cross of the Austrian Red Cross (1917)
- Military Merit Medal (Austria–Hungary) (1918)
- Red Cross Medal (Prussia)
- Honorary Citizen of Wolfurt (1957)
- Austrian Decoration for Science and Art (1959)
- Medal of Vorarlberg in Gold (1964)
- Ring of Honour of the City of Vienna (1965)

In 1940 Böhler was elected a member of the German Academy of Sciences Leopoldina. The new building for the Accident Hospital opened in 1972, and was named after him (Emergency Hospital Vienna Lorenz Böhler). A street in Vienna's 20th District (Brigittenau) was also named for him.

He been an honorary member of 33 worldwide associations.

== Publications ==
Böhler published more than 400 scientific papers.

His magnum opus Treatment of Fractures (1929) did not start out as a success. Medical specialist printers refused to publish it, so Böhler asked the bookseller Wilhelm Maudrich (jun.) to help him. Böhler had to pay the printing cost and finally the book – though it was criticized by some of Böhlers colleagues – became a top seller. Wilhelm Maudrich then became a medical specialist printer Verlag Maudrich. It was translated into eight languages: English, Spanish, French, Italian, Russian, Hungarian, Polish and Chinese. The first edition of the book had 176 pages. By 1957, it reached 2,500 pages; Böhler constantly worked on it, updating and expanding.

Some of his other publications include:

- Die Spezialisierung der Frakturbehandlung für die Kriegszeit, eine Frage von grösster volkswirtschaftlicher Bedeutung. In: Zentralblatt für Chirurgie 44 (1918)
- Wie schützen wir die Verwundeten vor Amputation und Krüppeltum? In: Zeitschrift für orthopädische Chirurgie 45 (1924): 244–281.
- Knochenbrüche und Unfallchirurgie in ihren Beziehungen zur Umwelt. Maudrich, Wien 1933.
- Wundbehandlung. In: Zeitschrift für ärztliche Fortbildung 38 (22) (1941): 545–552.
- Unfallkrankenhäuser, Unfallabteilungen, Unfallkliniken. In: Archiv für orthopädische und Unfall-Chirurgie 42 (1) (1942): 5-23.
- Vorschlag zur Marknagelung nach Küntscher bei frischen Oberschenkelschussbrüchen. In: Der Chirurg 15 (1) (1943): 8–13.
- Verbandlehre für Schwestern, Helfer, Studenten und Ärzte. Maudrich, Wien 1947.
