= Adolph Stöhr =

Austrian philosopher (1855–1921)

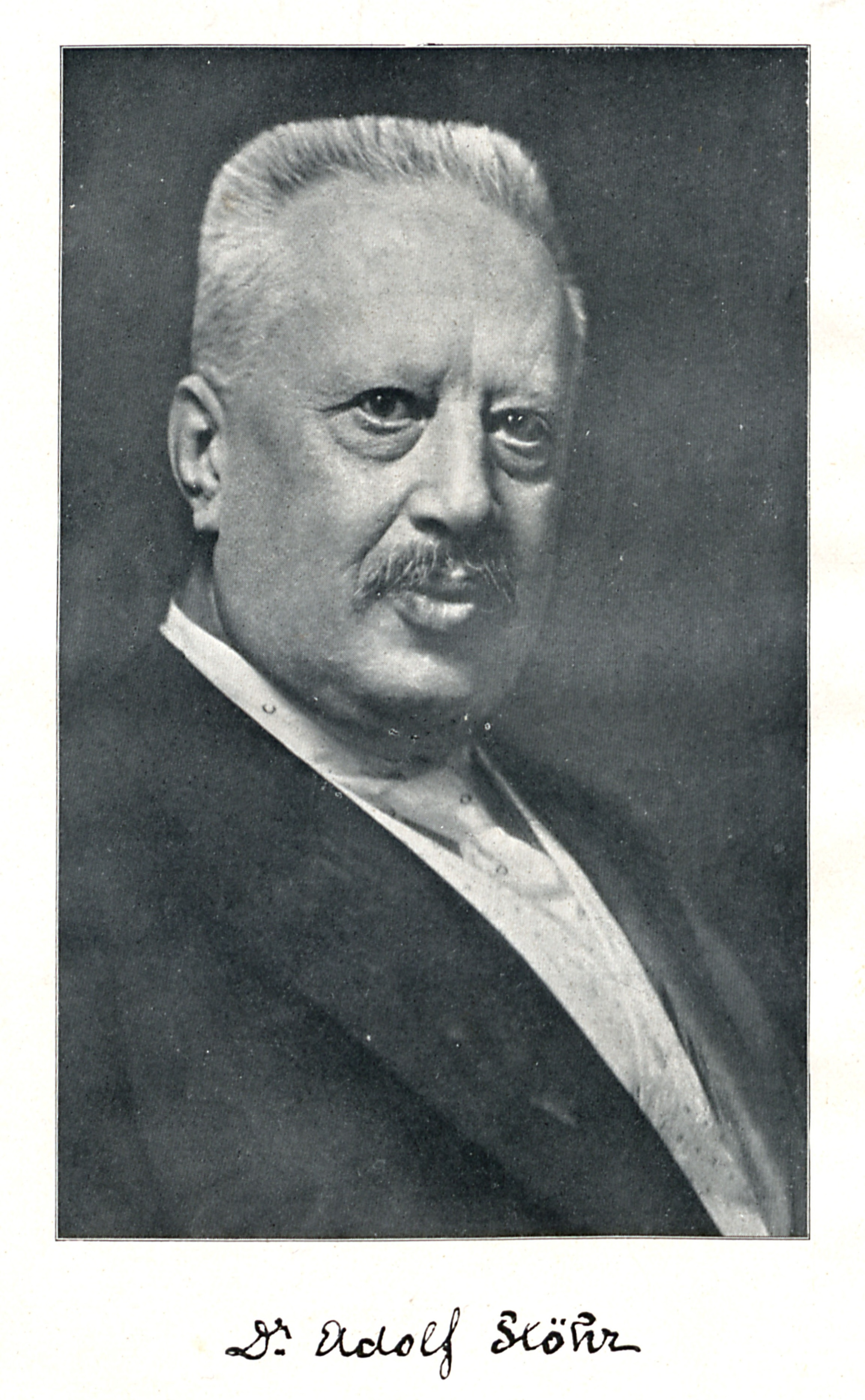
- Born: February 24, 1855; Sankt Pölten, Lower Austria
- Died: February 10, 1921 (aged 65); Vienna
- Occupations: Professor of Philosophy and Psychology

Adolph Stöhr (February 24, 1855 – February 10, 1921) was professor of philosophy at the University of Vienna. His lectures and publications covered subjects such as logic, metaphysics, philosophy of language, experimental psychology, psychology of perception, and psychology of association.

Stöhr was born in St. Pölten in Lower Austria on February 24, 1855. He went on to study law, botany, and philosophy at the University of Vienna. He started teaching at the university in 1885, becoming a full professor in 1911.

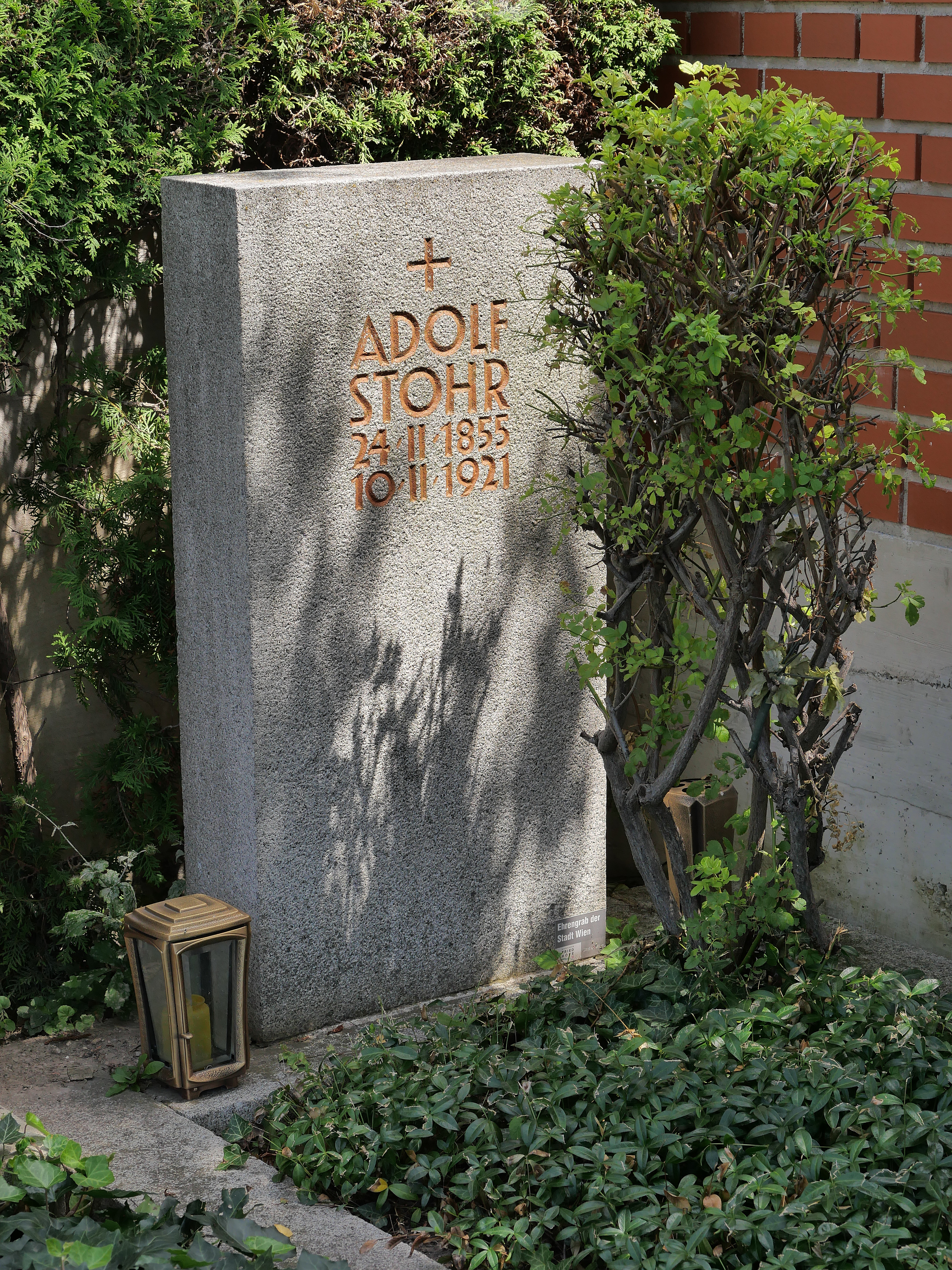
Grave of Adolf Stöhr in the Döbling Cemetery

== Publications ==
During his academic career, Stöhr published around 30 works in the fields of philosophy and logic.

- Philosophische Konstruktionen und Reflexionen 1974 (posthumous)
- Lehrbuch der Logik in psychologisierender Darstellung 1910
- Philosophie der unbelebten Materie 1907
- Zur Hypothese der Sehstoffe und Grundfarben 1898
- Die erste Volkshochschule 1965 (posthumous)
- Letzte Lebenseinheiten und ihr Verband in einem Keimplasma, vom philosophischen Standpunkte ... 1897
- Philosophie der unbelebten Materie: Hypothetische Darstellung der Einheit des Stoffes und seines ... 1907
- Zur nativistischen Behandlung des Tiefensehens 1892
- Umriss einer Theorie der Namen 1889
