= Hugo Charlemont =

Austrian painter (1850–1939)

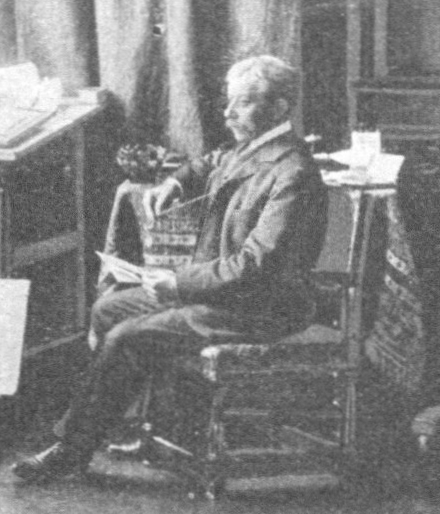
- Born: 18 March 1850; Jemnice, Moravia
- Died: 18 March 1939 (aged 89); Vienna
- Resting place: Döbling Cemetery
- Known for: Painting

Hugo Charlemont (18 March 1850 – 18 March 1939) was an Austrian painter. Born in Jemnice, Moriva he was the son of Matthias Adolf Charlemont. He studied art at the Academy of Fine Arts. He died in Vienna.

== Life ==
Charlemont was born in Jemnice, Moravia. He was the son of the miniature painter Matthias Adolf Charlemont and the brother of the painters Eduard Charlemont (1848–1906) and Theodor Charlemont (1859–1938). Hugo's daughter Lilly Charlemont also was an artist.

From 1873 he studied art at the Academy of Fine Arts, Vienna under Eduard von Lichtenfels. Charlemont was a painter of landscapes, still lifes, genre subjects, animals, and portraits. He died in Vienna.

== Works ==
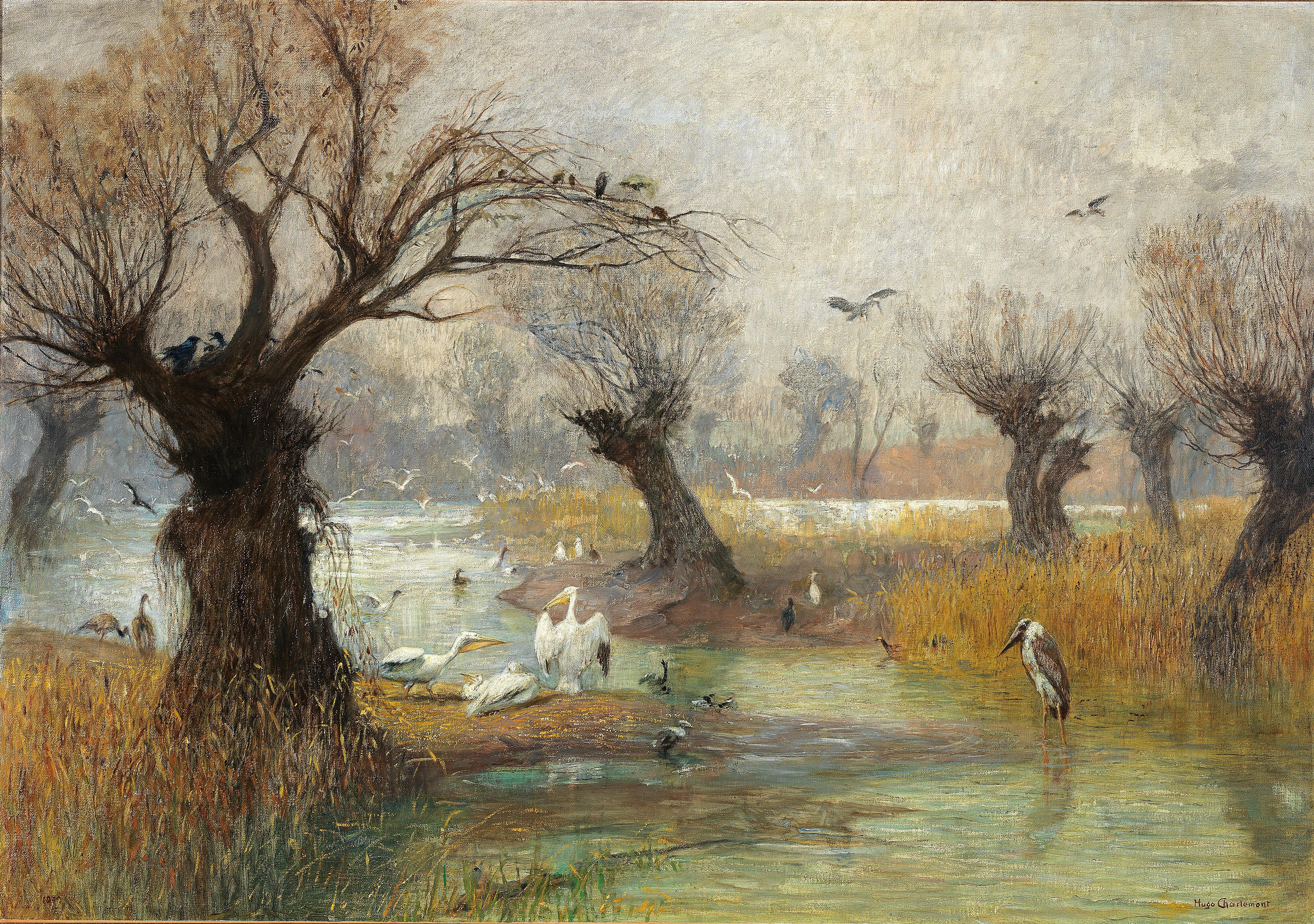
Pelicans on the Riverbank

- Interieur with a forge (Vienna, Austrian gallery, Inv. No. 2784), 1883, oil on wood, 48.5 x 70 cm
- Highway with Birkenallee (Vienna, Austrian gallery, Inv. No. 253), 1894, oil on wood, 68 x 100 cm
- Park with elegant Viennese villa (Vienna museum), 1902, oil on canvas, 145 x 100 cm
- Young woman with azalea plant (Vienna museum), 1928, oil on canvas, 68 x 83 cm
- Illustration to "Kronprinzenwerk" (Austrian-Hungarian monarchy in word and pictures, 1885–1902).
- Harp, (Sweden, private collection) ND, oil on wood
- Forest Pond, (Colorado, private collection) 1922, oil on canvas, 36 x 26 cm
