= Rudolf Ribarz =

Austrian painter (1848–1904)

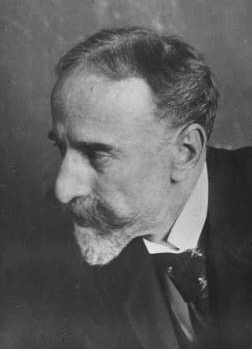
Rudolf Ribarz (c.1895)

Rudolf Ribarz (30 May 1848, Vienna - 12 November 1904, Vienna) was an Austrian landscape painter.

== Life and work ==
His father was a successful merchant; a profession he initially trained for, until he discovered his interest in painting. At first, he secretly took lessons from the landscape painter, Joseph Holzer then, around 1864, enrolled at the Academy of Fine Arts, Vienna, where he studied with Albert Zimmermann. In 1868, he visited an exhibition in Munich, and was especially impressed by the French art. From 1870 to 1872, he travelled to the South Tyrol, Trentino and Venice. This was followed, in 1875, by a study visit to Brussels.

In 1876, he finally found the means to make an extended stay in Paris, where he came into contact with the works of the Barbizon School. Thanks to the art dealer, Charles Sedelmeyer, who was originally from Vienna, he was able to meet Charles-François Daubigny, one of the group's last surviving members. More study trips followed, to Oldebroek, Dordrecht and Rotterdam in the Netherlands, and to Normandy. He also participated in numerous exhibitions, including the Columbian Exposition in Chicago.

It was 1892 before he returned to Vienna and, despite his long absence, was soon offered an appointment as manager of the flower painting department at the Arts and Crafts School (now the University of Applied Arts). There, he cultivated a simple, intimate style of landscape painting; inspired by his time in France. During the 1890s, he experimented with Japonisme.

In 1899. he was forced to retire, due to a worsening "nervous condition". He died in 1904 at a psychiatric asylum, and was interred at Döbling Cemetery. A street in Vienna's Ottakring district was named after him in 1936.

== Selected paintings ==
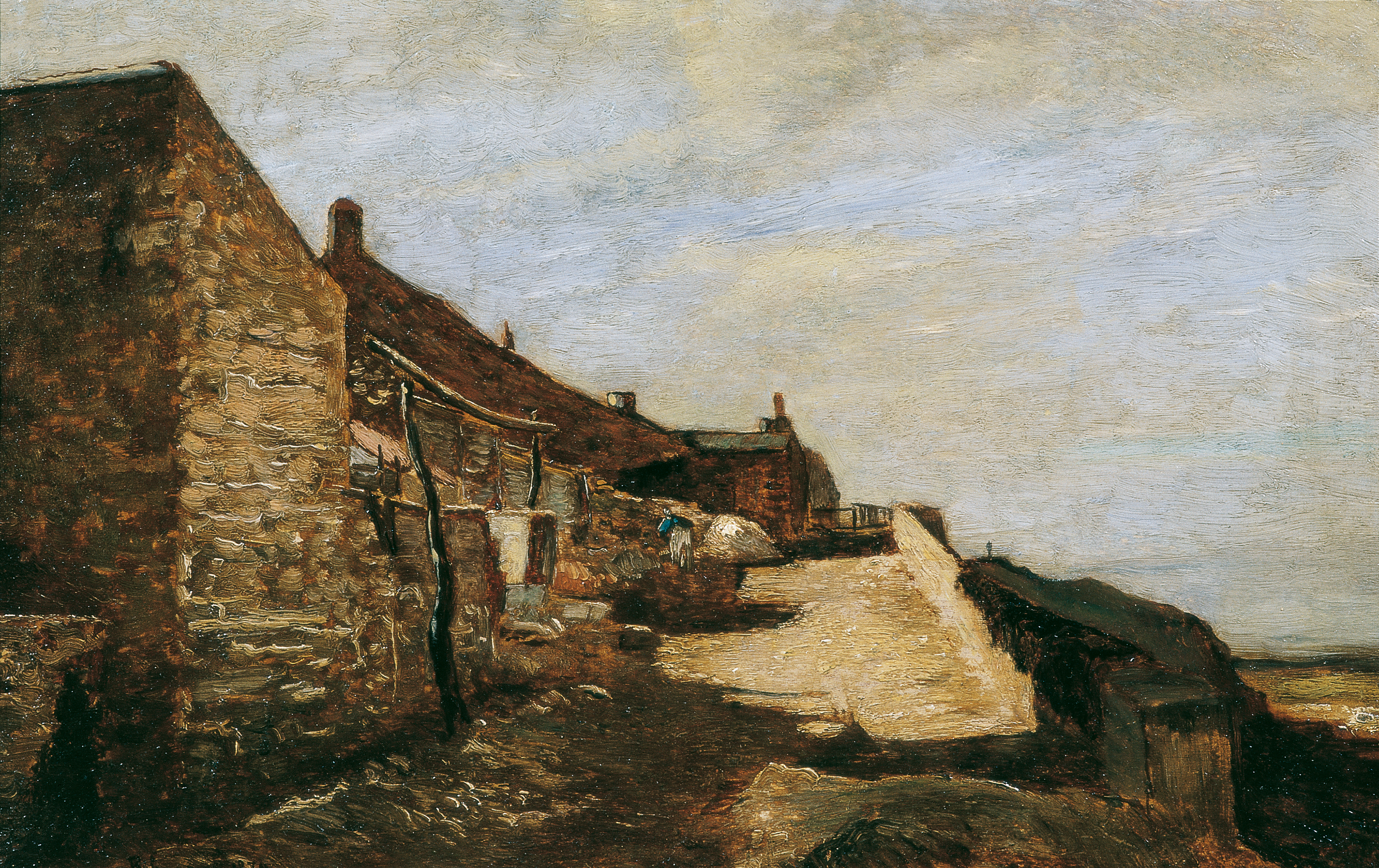
The Pont de Moutiers in Thiers

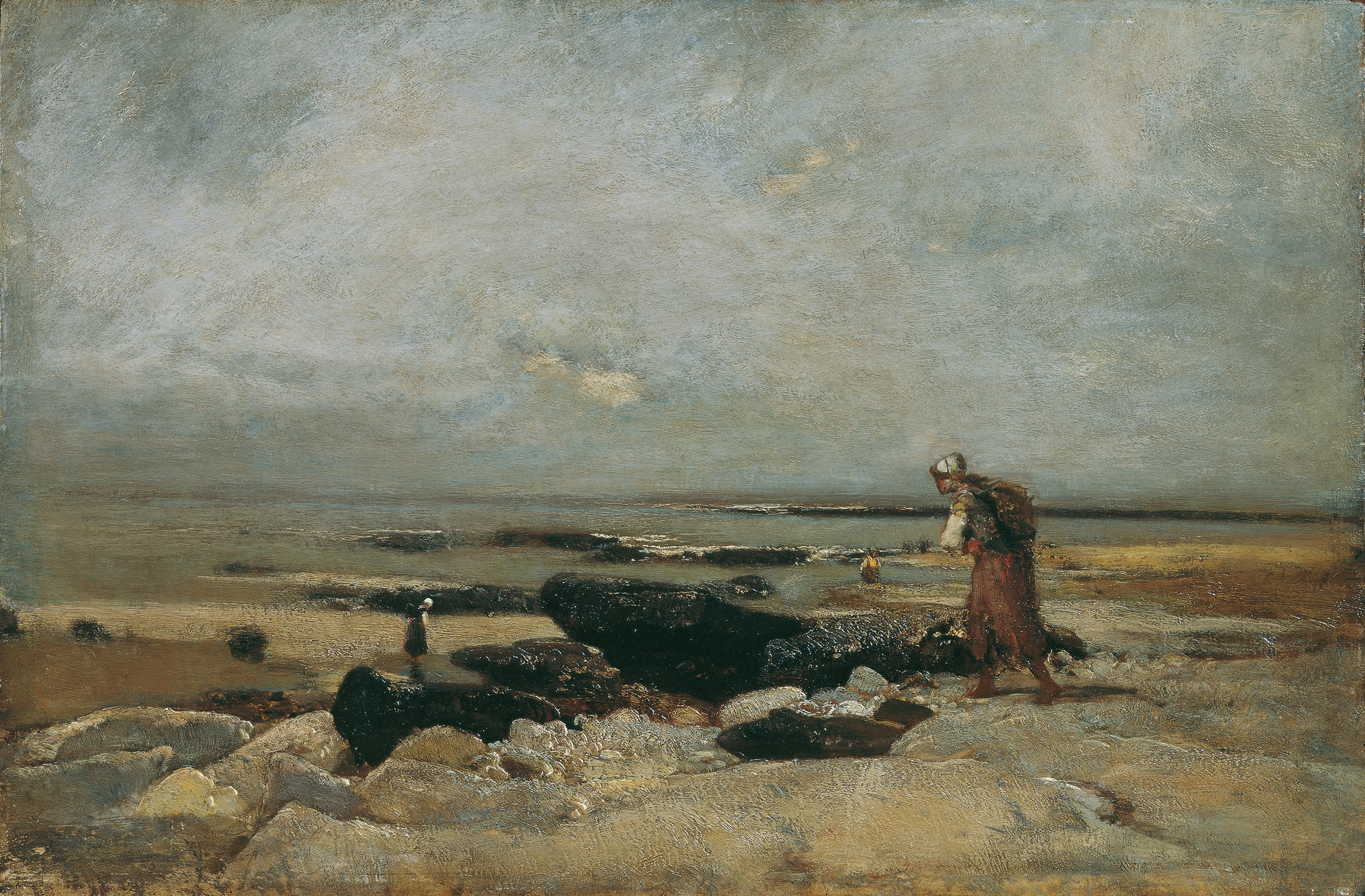
The Dunes near Le Tréport

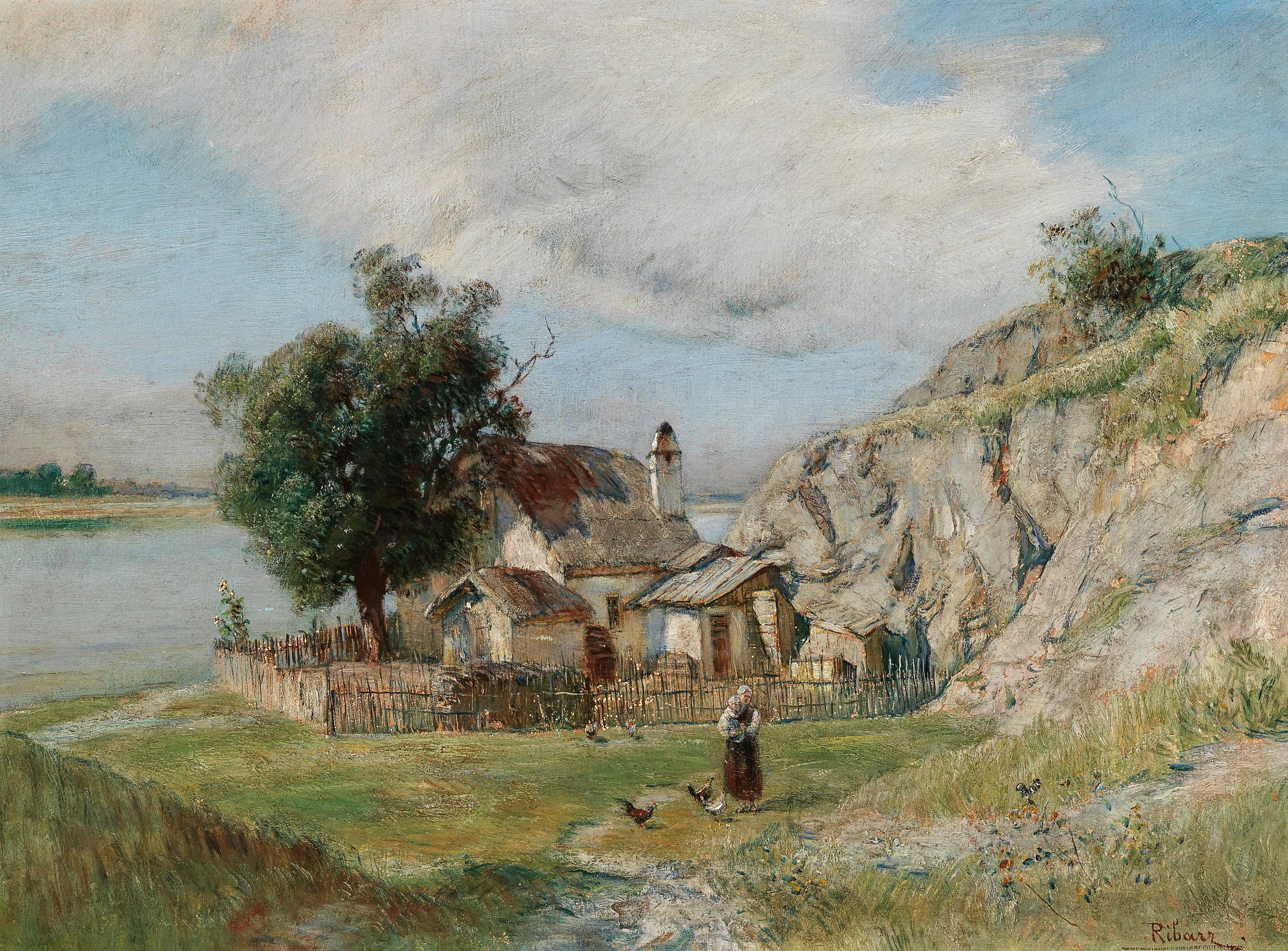
Cottage in Hainburg an der Donau

== Sources ==
- Constantin von Wurzbach: "Ribarz, Rudolph." In: Biographisches Lexikon des Kaiserthums Oesterreich (Biographical Lexicon of the Empire of Austria). Part 26 Kaiserlich-königliche Hof- und Staatsdruckerei, Vienna 1874, p. 7 (digitalised).
- M. Haja: "Ribarz Rudolf". In: Österreichisches Biographisches Lexikon 1815–1950 (ÖBL). Vol. 9, Austrian Academy of Sciences, Vienna 1988, ISBN 3-7001-1483-4, p. 116.
- Martina Haja (Ed.): Rudolf Ribarz. Ein Maler des österreichischen Stimmungsimpressionismus (exhibition catalog) Österreichische Galerie Belvedere, Vienna, 1978
