= Heiligenstadt =

Heiligenstadt may refer to:

- Heilbad Heiligenstadt, Thuringia, Germany
- Heiligenstadt in Oberfranken, Bavaria, Germany
- Heiligenstadt, Vienna, Austria
- Heiligenstadt, part of Neuhaus, Carinthia, Austria

== See also ==
- Heiligenstadt station (disambiguation)
- Heiligenstadt Testament, an 1802 letter written by Ludwig van Beethoven written at Heiligenstadt, Vienna
