= Kahlenbergerdorf =

Kahlenbergerdorf

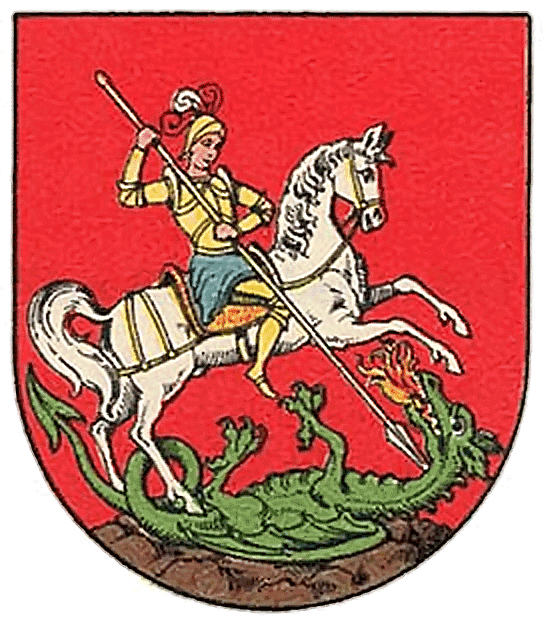
Coat of arms

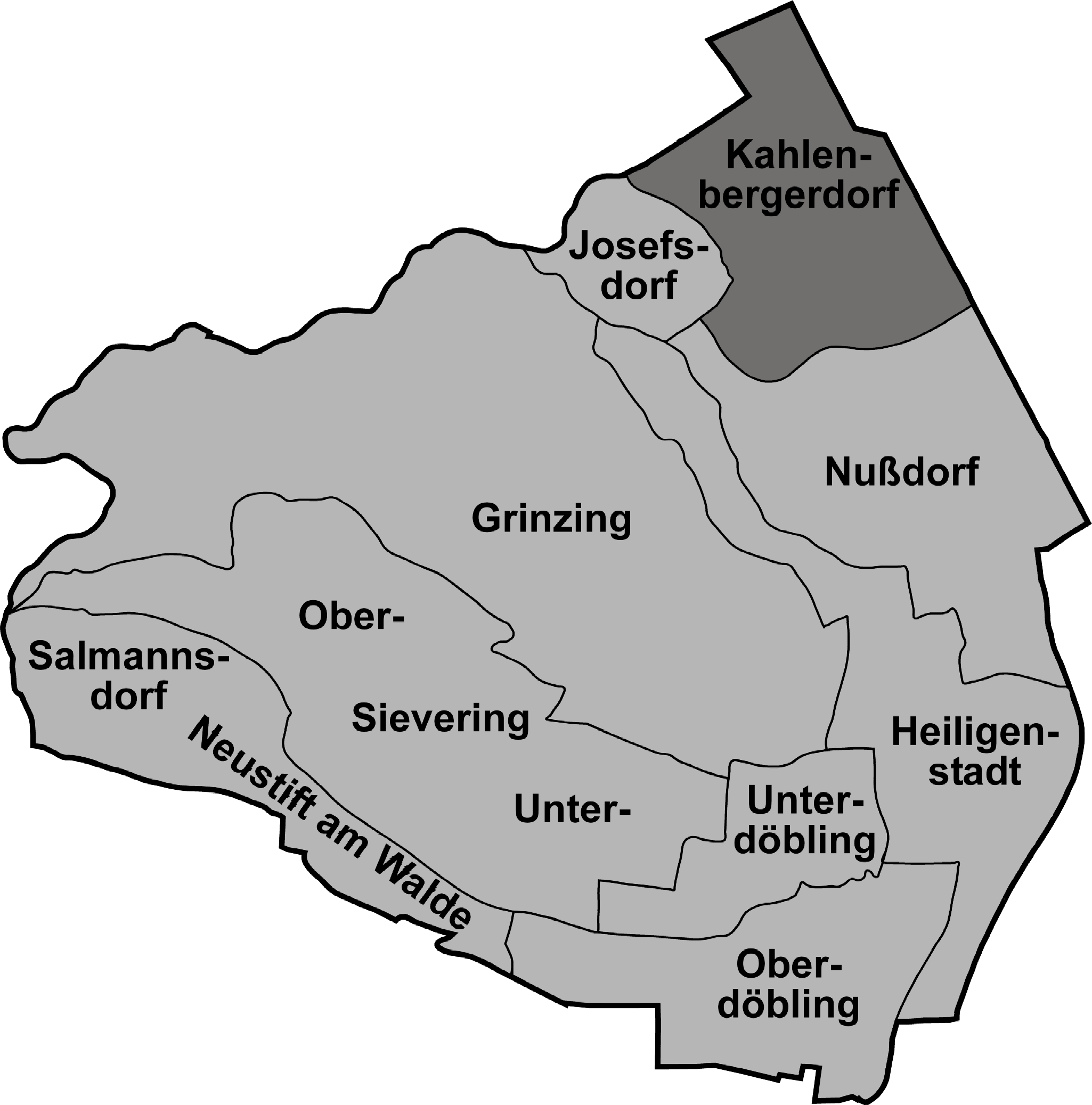
Map

Location: 48°16′29″N 16°21′18″E

Kahlenbergerdorf (Central Bavarian: Koinbeagaduaf) was an independent municipality until 1892 and is today a part of Döbling, the 19th district of Vienna. It is also one of the 89 Katastralgemeinden.

== Geography ==
=== Location ===
Kahlenbergerdorf lies in the north of Vienna on the right-hand bank of the Danube river in a valley between the Nußberg and Leopoldsberg hills. In the north, Kahlenbergerdorf borders Weidling, and in the east Jedlesee. To the south lies Nußdorf, to the west, Josefsdorf. The parish cemetery lies amongst the vineyards above the centre of Kahlenbergerdorf, which covers a total area of 226,01 hectares. In statistical analyses, Kahlenbergerdorf is counted in the region Nußdorf-Kahlenbergerdorf.

=== Topography ===
Kahlenbergerdorf includes many forested ridges of the Wienerwald (Vienna Woods).

== History ==
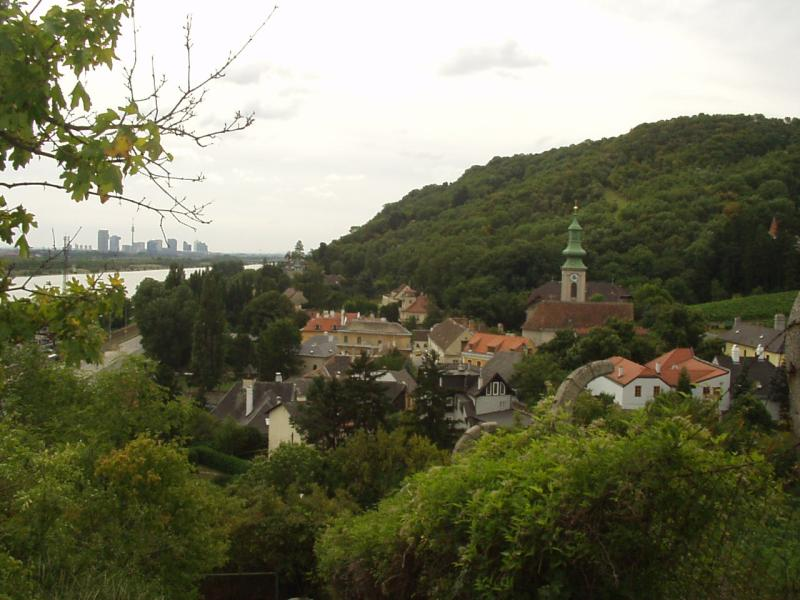
Kahlenbergerdorf in Vienna

=== The origin of the name Kahlenbergerdorf ===
The village has been known as Kahlenbergerdörfl for hundreds of years. It is first mentioned in an official document dating to 1133/36 as "de Chalwenperge". The Leopoldsberg hill was named "Kahlenberg" until 1693, but it is not to be confused with the neighbouring hill, known now as Kahlenberg, of which the town of Kahlenbergerdorf has no territorial share.

=== Early events ===
Viticulture can be traced back 2500 years, when Celts settled in the vicinity of the Leopoldsberg hill.

=== Kahlenbergerdorf in the Middle Ages ===
In the 12th century, the Chalenperger noble family arose in Kahlenbergerdorf. The inhabitants of the village were farmers, who were largely reliant on their own produce. Wine and fruit were produced for sale. At the end of the 12th century, viticulture was already the dominant industry around Kahlenberg. The local duke and the Klosterneuburg Monastery each owned numerous vineyards. The monastery even had its own wine press, but it gave this to the Fürst on his request. In the following centuries, many other monasteries and churches took possession of vineyards in Kahlenbergerdorf, including the Zwettl Abbey, the Lilienfeld Abbey, the Kremsmünster Monastery, Saint Bernhard Nunnery and St. Dorothea. The Kahlenberg was also mined; there is documentary evidence of this between 1547 and 1618. At first, only ore is mentioned, but later texts make reference to silver finds. The deposits in the Kahlenberg are however so limited that they were quickly exhausted. Between 1330 and 1339, Gundacker von Thernberg, known as the “Pfaff vom Kahlenberg”, was the parish priest (Pfarrer) in Kahlenbergerdorf. Anecdotes about Thernberg were recorded in the 15th century by Phillip Frankfurter in his work Des pfaffen geschicht und histori vom Kalenberg (The story of the parish priest and the history of the Kalenberg). The Kahlenbergerdorf parish church is recorded as a separate parish for the first time in 1256.

=== Kahlenbergerdorf since the Middle Ages ===
In 1529, the parish church was destroyed during the first siege of Vienna. It was later rebuilt.

Due to its location on the banks of the Danube, Kahlenbergerdorf suffered from severe inundations. The establishment of the harbour in Kuchelau outside the entrance to the Danube channel in 1901-03 however brought with it effective protection against flooding.

After the dissolution of the Camaldolese hermitage on the Kahlenberg hill, the area was made available for construction and a small settlement arose, which was given the name Josefsdorf in 1784 in honour of Joseph II.

Thanks to its location on the edge of a narrow valley between the Danube and the Leopoldsberg, Kahlenbergerdorf has been able to maintain its original character. The village also developed less quickly than other parts of modern-day Döbling. It is possible that flooding caused Kahlenbergerdorf to shrink in the 18th century. In 1795, there were 24 houses, in 1831 there were five more and a total of 234 inhabitants. Between then and 1890, Kahlenbergerdorf grew to number 52 houses with 486 inhabitants.

In 1892, Kahlenbergerdorf was integrated into the city of Vienna. The area as far as the “nose” of the Leopoldsberg was included along with its neighbours Sievering, Grinzing, Oberdöbling, Unterdöbling, Nußdorf and Heiligenstadt in the district of Döbling, while the rest of Kahlenbergerdorf was allocated to Klosterneuburg.

== Economy ==
In 1800, half of the land in Kahlenbergerdorf was occupied by woods, while vineyards covered another quarter. Orchids and fields made up less than 10 percent. Although viticulture was dominant, there were plans to open a brewery here in the 19th century. When the plans were approved in 1839, however, ethanol and vinegar were produced instead of beer. Production continued until around 1860. There was also a sugar factory in Kahlenbergerdorf between 1834 and circa 1870. The establishment of the harbour in Kuchelau was expected to bring profits to Kahlenbergerdorf, but the harbour never achieved the prominence of the harbour in Nußdorf. It had been designed as a point for boats to wait before entering the harbour in Freudenau and was meant to serve numerous small ships. It only ever became economically important for the logging industry, and after World War II it was converted into a marina for rowing clubs and motorboats.
