= Kahlenbergerdorf Parish Church =

Parish church in Vienna, Austria

Coordinates: 48°16′28″N 16°21′17″E

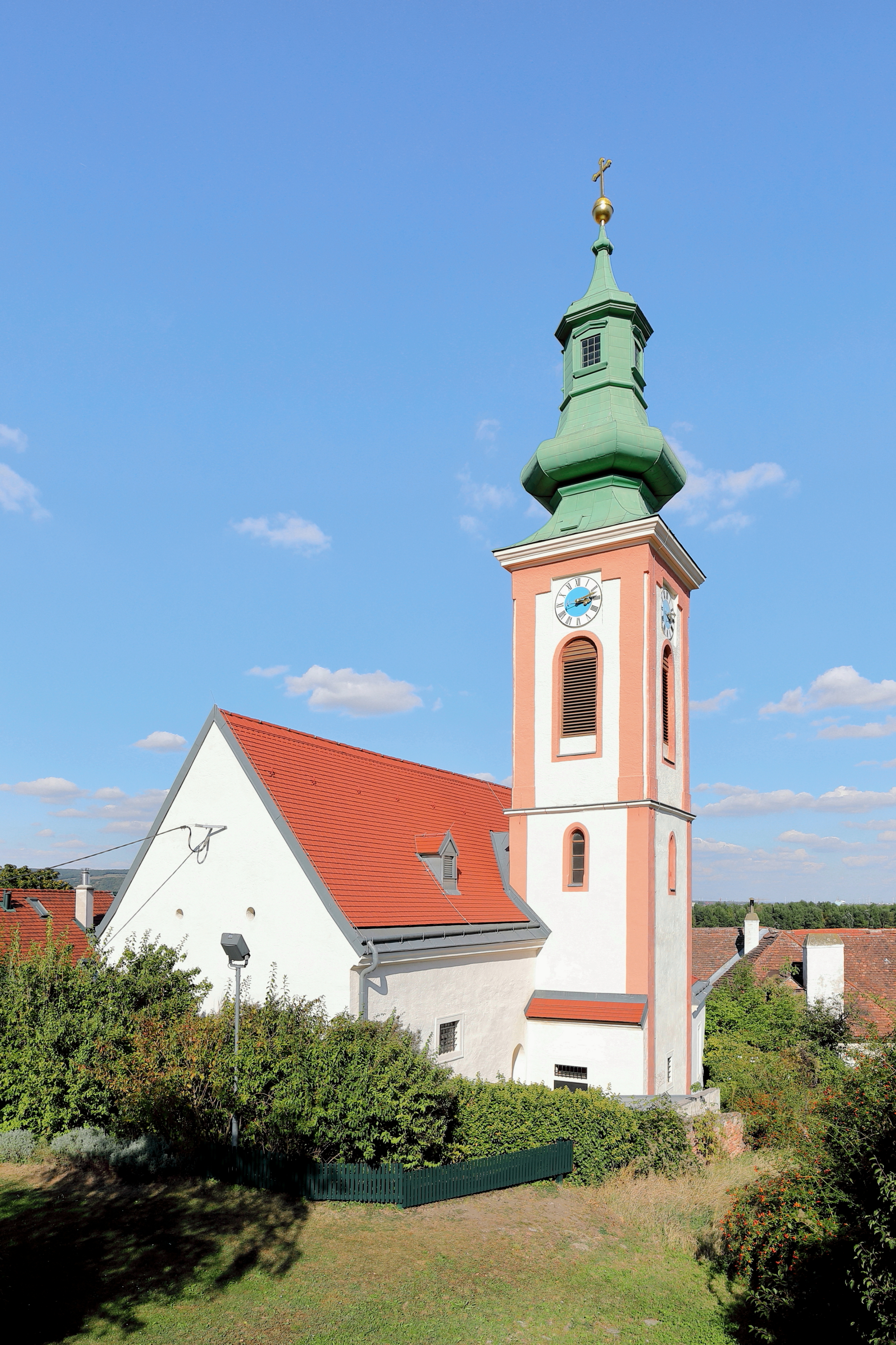
Kahlenbergerdorf Parish Church

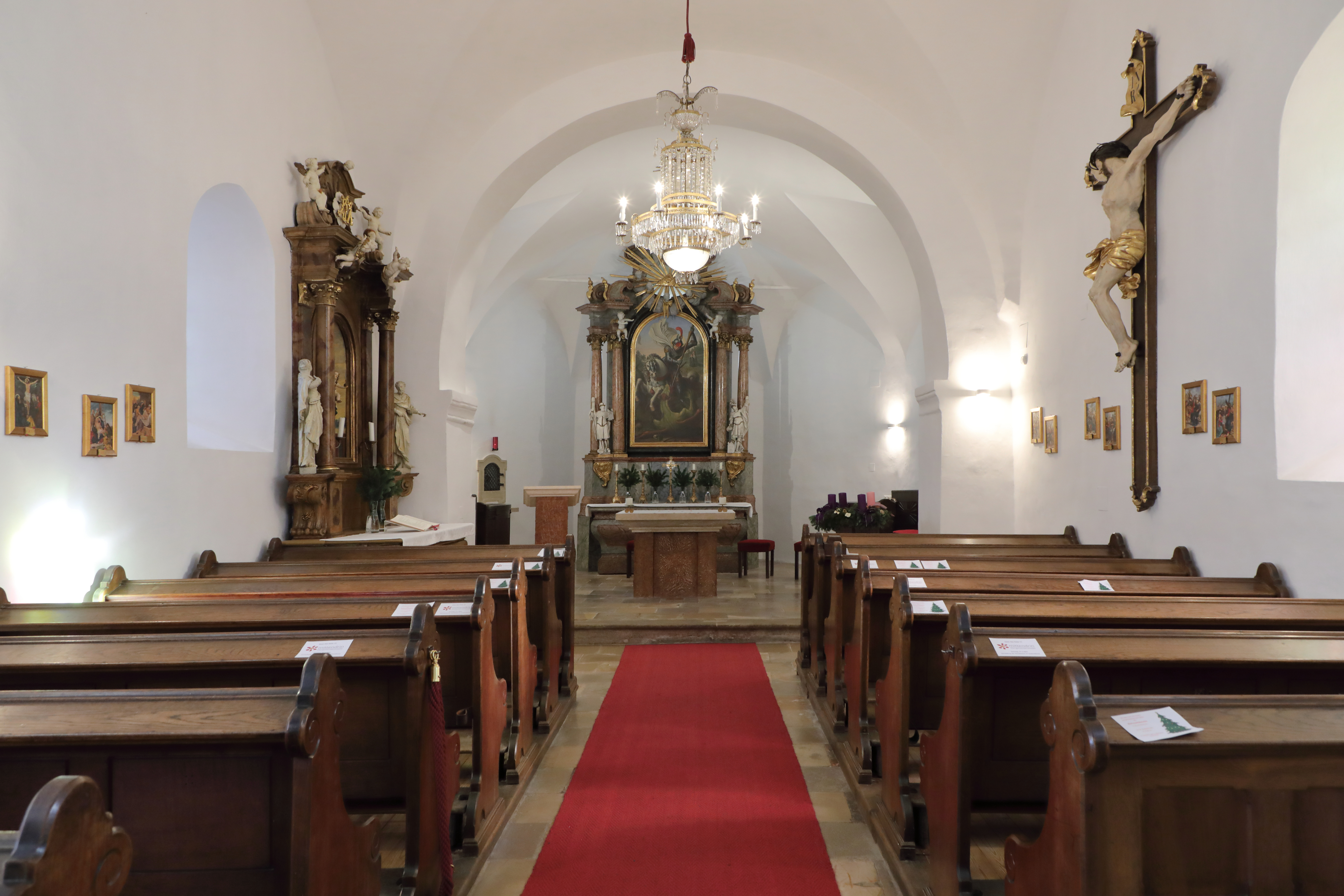
Interior view of the parish church

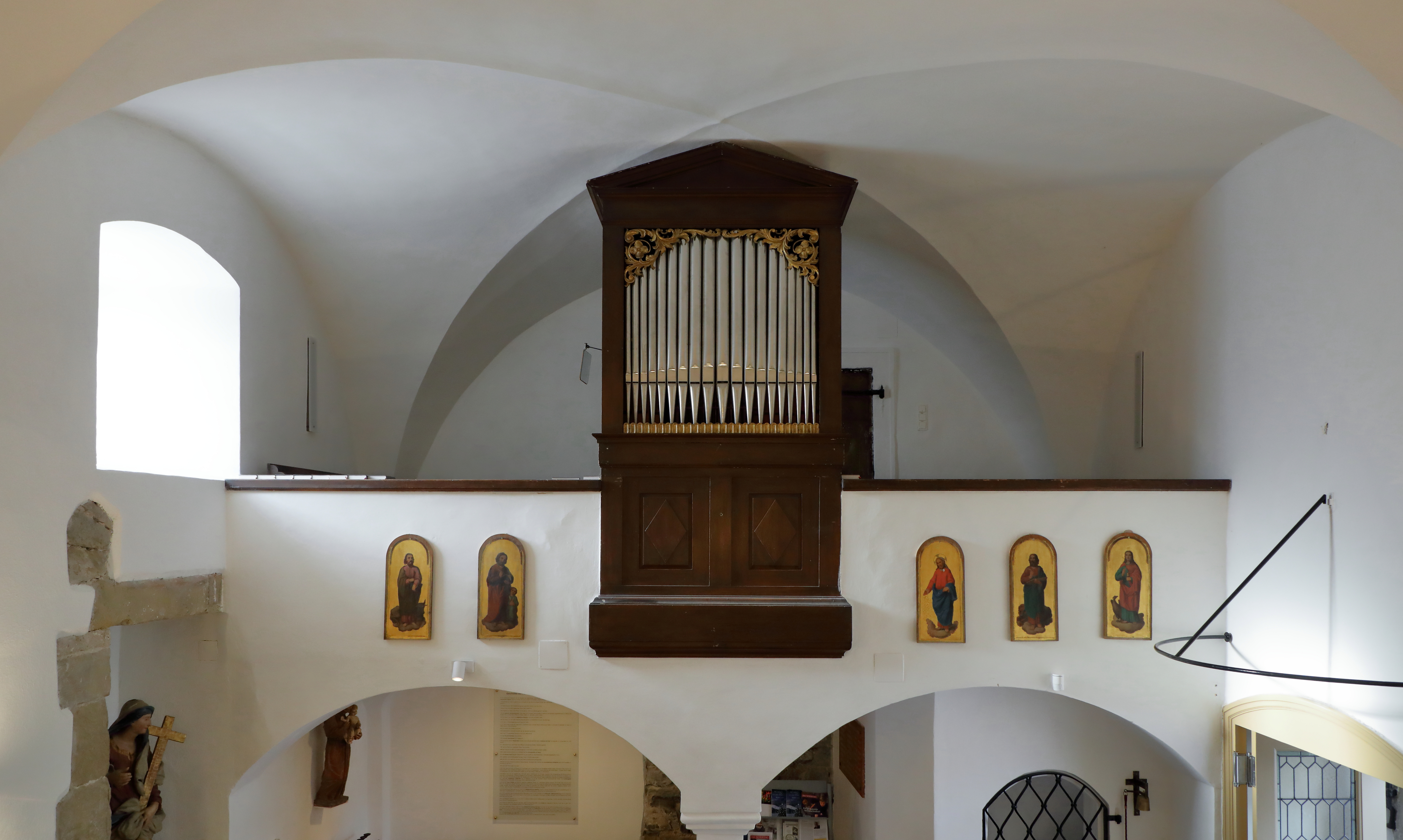
Organ of the parish church

The Kahlenbergerdorf Parish Church (Pfarrkirche Kahlenbergerdorf) is a Roman Catholic parish church in the suburb of Kahlenbergerdorf in the 19th district of Vienna, Döbling. It is dedicated to Saint George.

== History ==
A church is recorded in Kahlenbergerdorf in 1168; it was already an independent parish in 1256. The church was destroyed in 1529 by the Turks but it was rebuilt. Renovation work took place in 1633 and 1771.

The parish church is based on a simple late Romanesque/early Gothic building, which was given a Baroque appearance during the last renovation. The southern spire was also given a Baroque roof. The church's white rib vault was erected on the remains of the medieval church that had been destroyed by the Turks.

== Interior ==
The central element of the church is the Baroque altar. He is flanked by statues of Saint Leopold and Saint Florian. The altarpiece shows a depiction of Saint George from 1827; it is the work of Nazarene painter Johann Stätter and was based on a sketch by Ludwig Ferdinand Schnorr von Carolsfeld. To the right of the altar, there is a late Gothic altar to Mary, which was erected in 1760. The depiction of the Madonna in the centre of the church dates from the early 16th century. There is a large, Baroque crucifix on the southern wall, which was originally part of an altar. The altar was placed on the northern external wall in 1732, but was removed in the 19th century. Further noteworthy elements of the church are a Gothic Baptismal font made of red marble (which dates to around 1500), an alms box decorated with rosettes, and a stoup (both date from the 17th century). The organ was made by Franz Ullmann in 1849.
