= Grinzing Parish Church =

Parish church

Coordinates: 48°15′24″N 16°20′23″E

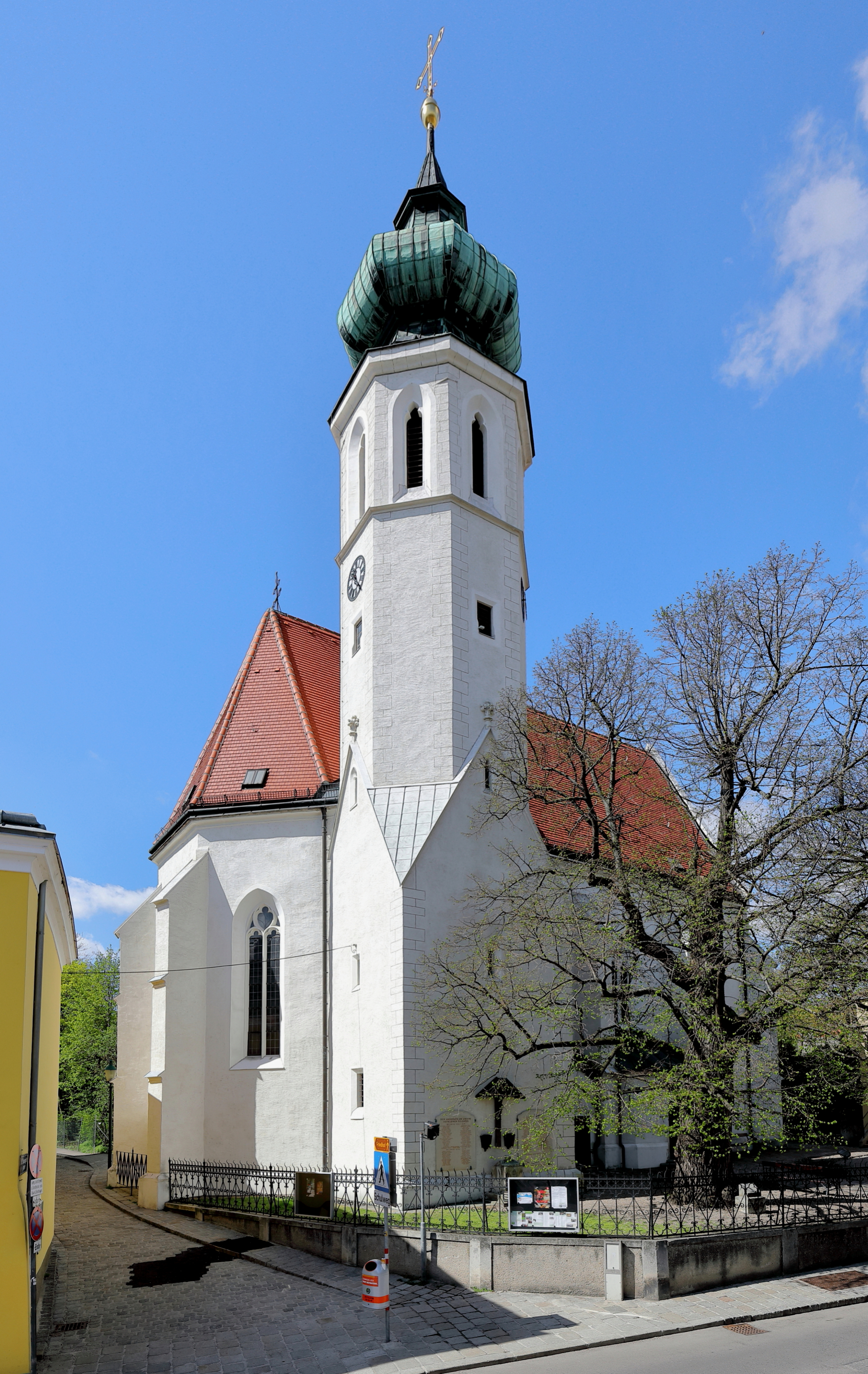
Grinzing Parish Church

The Grinzing Parish Church is the Roman Catholic parish church of Grinzing in the 19th district of Döbling, western Vienna, Austria.

It is located at Himmelstraße 25 in the centre of Grinzing. It is consecrated to the Holy Cross and belongs to the city deanery 19 of the Vicariate Vienna City of the Archdiocese of Vienna. The building is listed as a cultural property.

== History ==
The Grinzing parish church was financed and built between 1417 and 1426 by twelve families, who were probably winemakers. This saved the Grinzing people from having to travel during the week to the Heiligenstadt parish church, which was from then on only visited on Sundays. It burned down twice in its history. In 1529 and 1683 the church was destroyed during the Ottoman–Habsburg wars and rebuilt with the help of Klosterneuburg Monastery.
