= Josefsdorf =

Quarter of Vienna

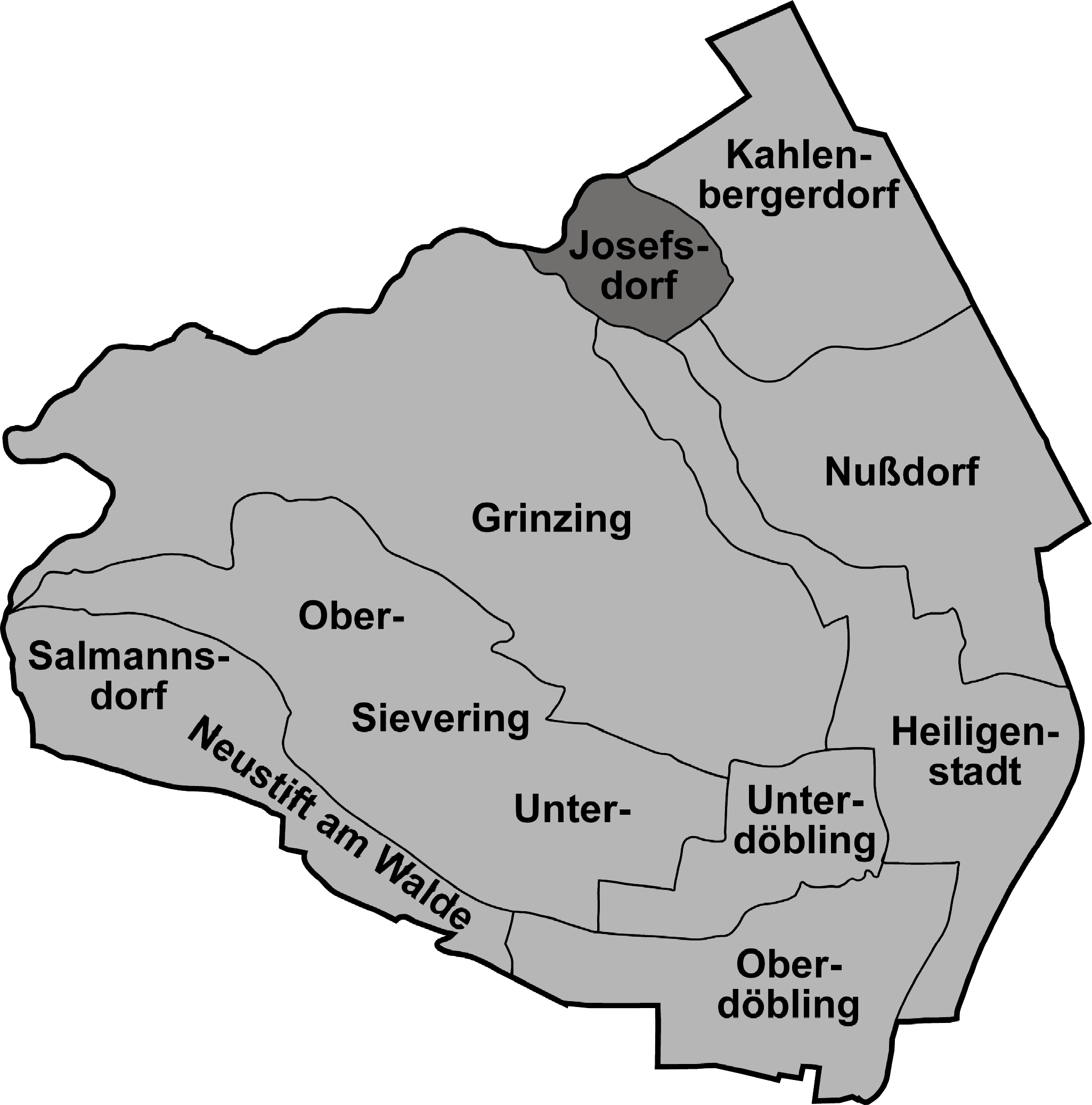
Josefsdorf
Coat of arms	Map
Location: 48°16′29″N 16°20′14″E

Josefsdorf (Central Bavarian: Josefsduaf) was an independent municipality until 1892 and is today a part of Döbling, the 19th district of Vienna. It is also one of the 89 Katastralgemeinden.

== Geography ==
Josefsdorf lies on one side of the Kahlenberg, on ground that slopes steeply towards Vienna. Covering an area of just 64.99 hectares, the Katastralgemeinde Josefsdorf is the smallest of the districts in Döbling. In statistical analyses conducted by the Austrian government, Josefsdorf is counted in the area Nußdorf-Kahlenbergerdorf.

== History ==
The Camaldolese laid the foundation for Josefsdorf in 1628. Ferdinand II had invited the Camaldolese into the land following Polish marshal Nikolaus Wolsky’s supplication. The settlement consisted de facto of nothing but a monastery (convent) and was named Schweinsberg, after the mountain on which it was built. Schweinsberg is the original designation for the Kahlenberg. The Camaldolese settlement resembled a small village; two rows each of 20 plots clustered around a church and two yards. The monastery was dedicated to Saint Joseph. Following the dissolution of the hermitage on 4 February 1782, Edler Leopold von Kriegl obtained ownership of the land. The small houses that once belonged to the Camaldolese were sold off and von Kriegl opened a restaurant in what had earlier been the hospice. The Klosterneuburg Monastery provided one of its choir masters as a chaplain for the church. The modern-day St. Josefskirche (Saint Joseph’s Church) was sanctified in 1783. A cemetery was established in the nearby woods at the same time. The settlement was named Josefsdorf in 1784, in honour of Joseph II. However in 1809 the Josefsdorf parish was dissolved and the settlement was allocated to the town of Kahlenbergerdorf. Thereafter, Josefsdorf no longer had its own mayor and it was administered from Kahlenbergerdorf.

Over the years, Josefsdorf remained a very small settlement. In 1832, there were 53 people living in 27 houses; in 1890 there were 37 houses but one inhabitant fewer. The Fürst zu Liechtenstein, a Moravian noble, was the last lord of Josefsdorf.

In 1892, Josefsdorf, as part of the Kahlenbergerdorf, along with the surrounding suburbs of Sievering, Grinzing, Oberdöbling, Unterdöbling, Nußdorf, Heiligenstadt was integrated into the 19th district of Vienna, Döbling.
