= Grinzing =

Quarter of Vienna

Grinzing

Coat of arms

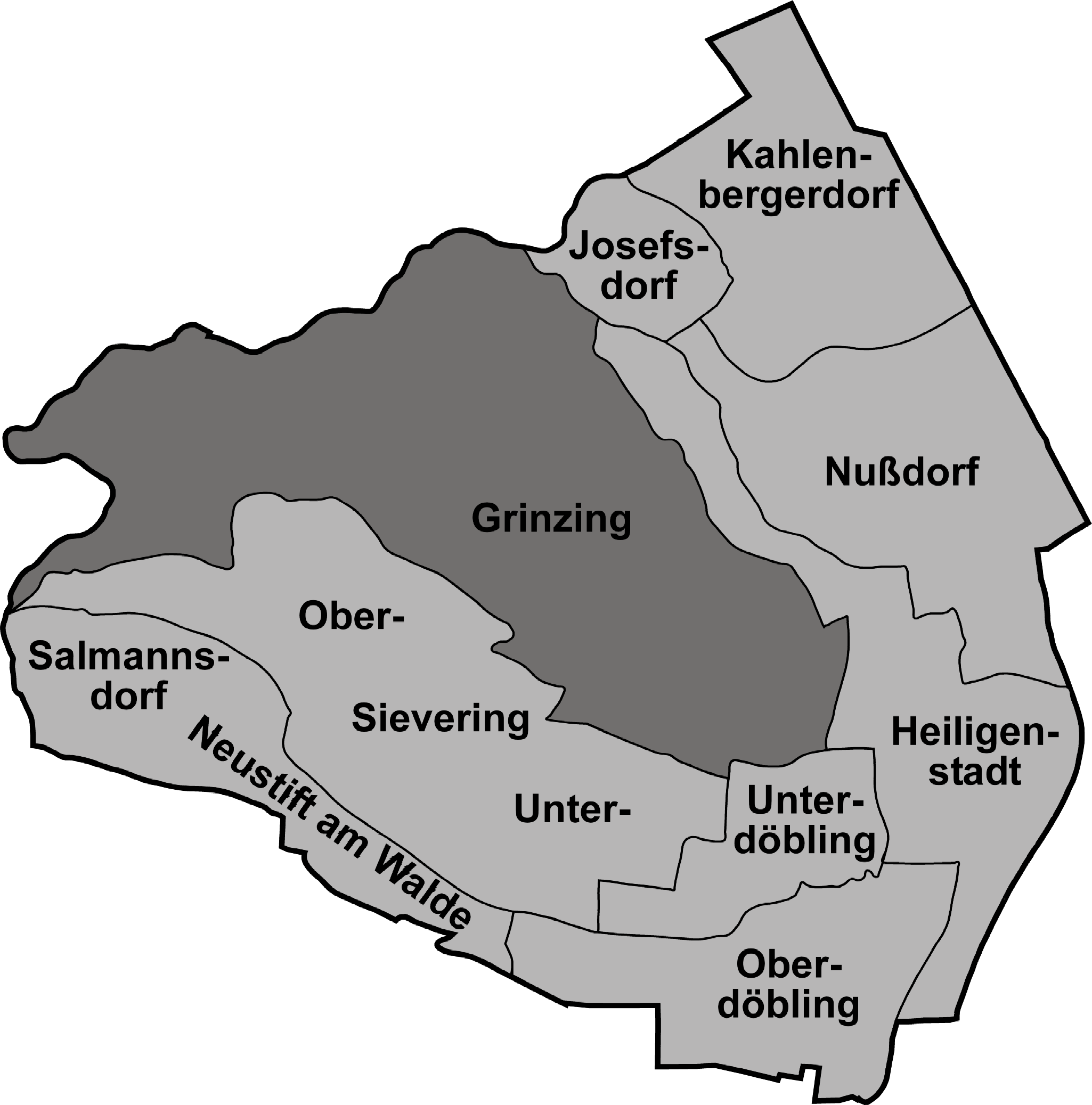
Map

Location: 48°15′16″N 16°20′34″E

Grinzing (German pronunciation: [ˈɡʁɪnt͡sɪŋ]) was an independent municipality until 1892 and is today a part of Döbling, the 19th district of Vienna.

== Geography ==
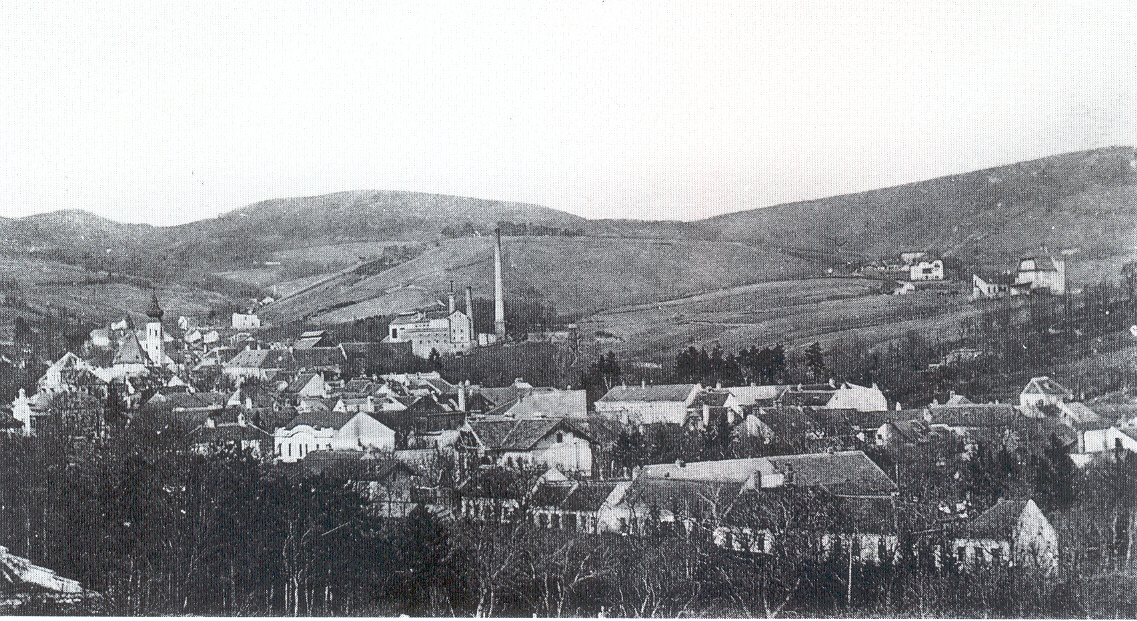
View of Grinzing with the Wienerwald in the back, around 1900

=== Location ===
Grinzing lies in the northwest of Vienna and, with an area of 613.52 hectares, is the largest suburb in the district of Döbling. To the northeast, it borders on Josefsdorf; the border continues along the Wildgrube and the Schreiberbach stream towards the east, where it branches along the Springsiedelgasse and the Neugebauerweg to the south. The border then runs along the Hungerbergstraße to mark the boundary to Unterdöbling, before following the course of the Kaasgraben, which divides Grinzing from Sievering in the east. Finally, the border turns northwestward and continues via the Himmelstraße and the Spießweg to the edge of the city of Vienna, which separates Grinzing from Weidling.

=== Topography ===
Grinzing is characterised by numerous forested ridges of the Wienerwald (Vienna Woods). Hermannskogel, the tallest hill in Vienna, lies on the border to Lower Austria. There are also other well-known hills, including the Reisenberg, Latisberg, Vogelsangberg, Hungerberg, and Pfaffenberg. Grinzing’s woods are home to several streams, including the Schreiberbach, which runs untouched through the Wildgrube almost as far as Nussdorf. The Reisenbergbach begins to the west of the Reisenberg and makes its way through Grinzing, where it flows into a canal. The headwaters of the Arbesbach also lie in the west of Grinzing. A further notable characteristic of the area are its grapevines, especially on the Reisenberg and Hungerberg hills.

== Etymology ==
The name "Grinzing" means "of the people who belong to a man named Grinzo". Many German words ending in "ing" are indicators of membership to a Sippe. A version of the name "Grinzing" first appears in 1114, when it was called Grinzigan.

== History ==
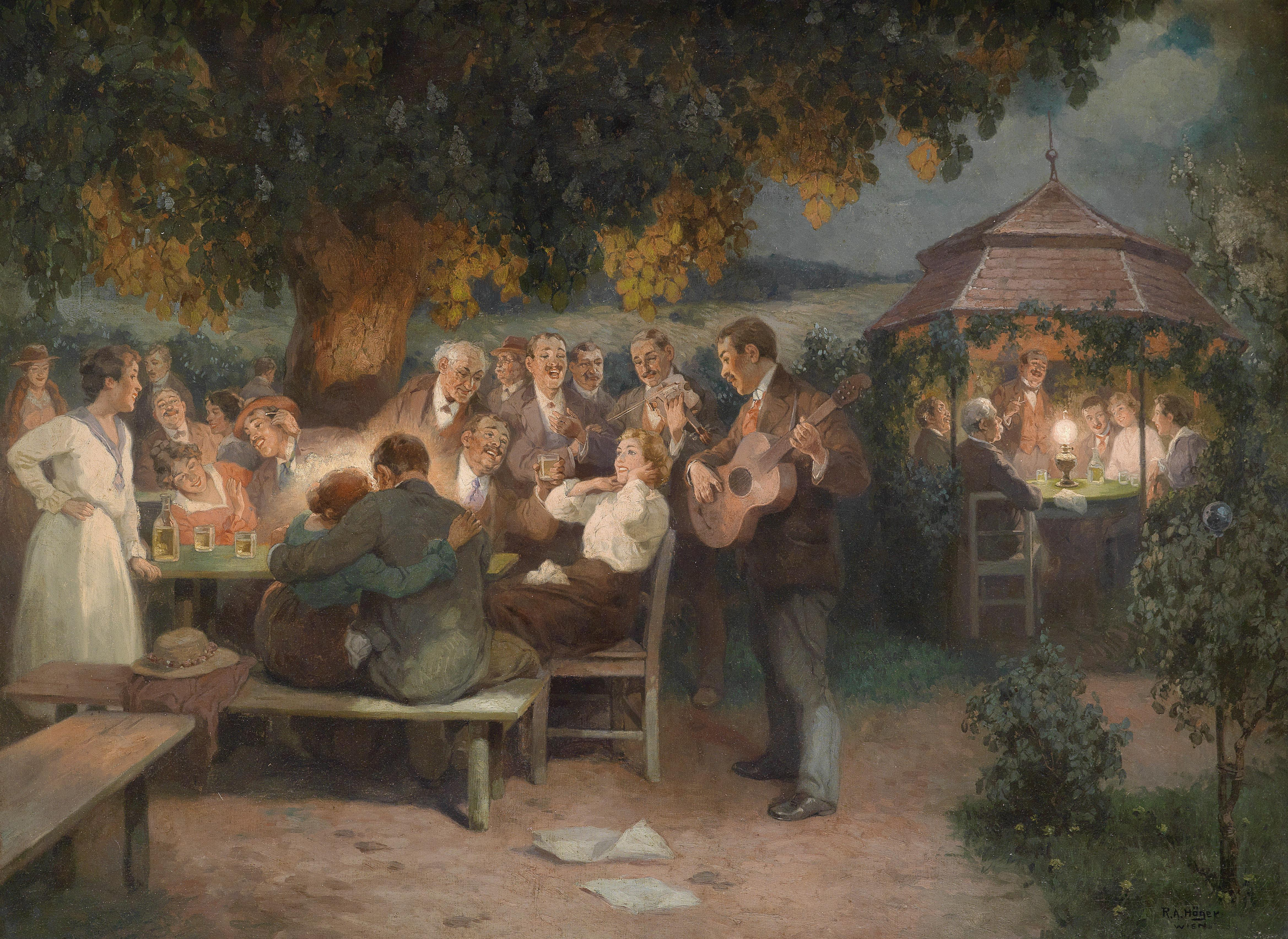
Beim Heurigen in Grinzing, painting by Rudolf Alfred Höger (1900)

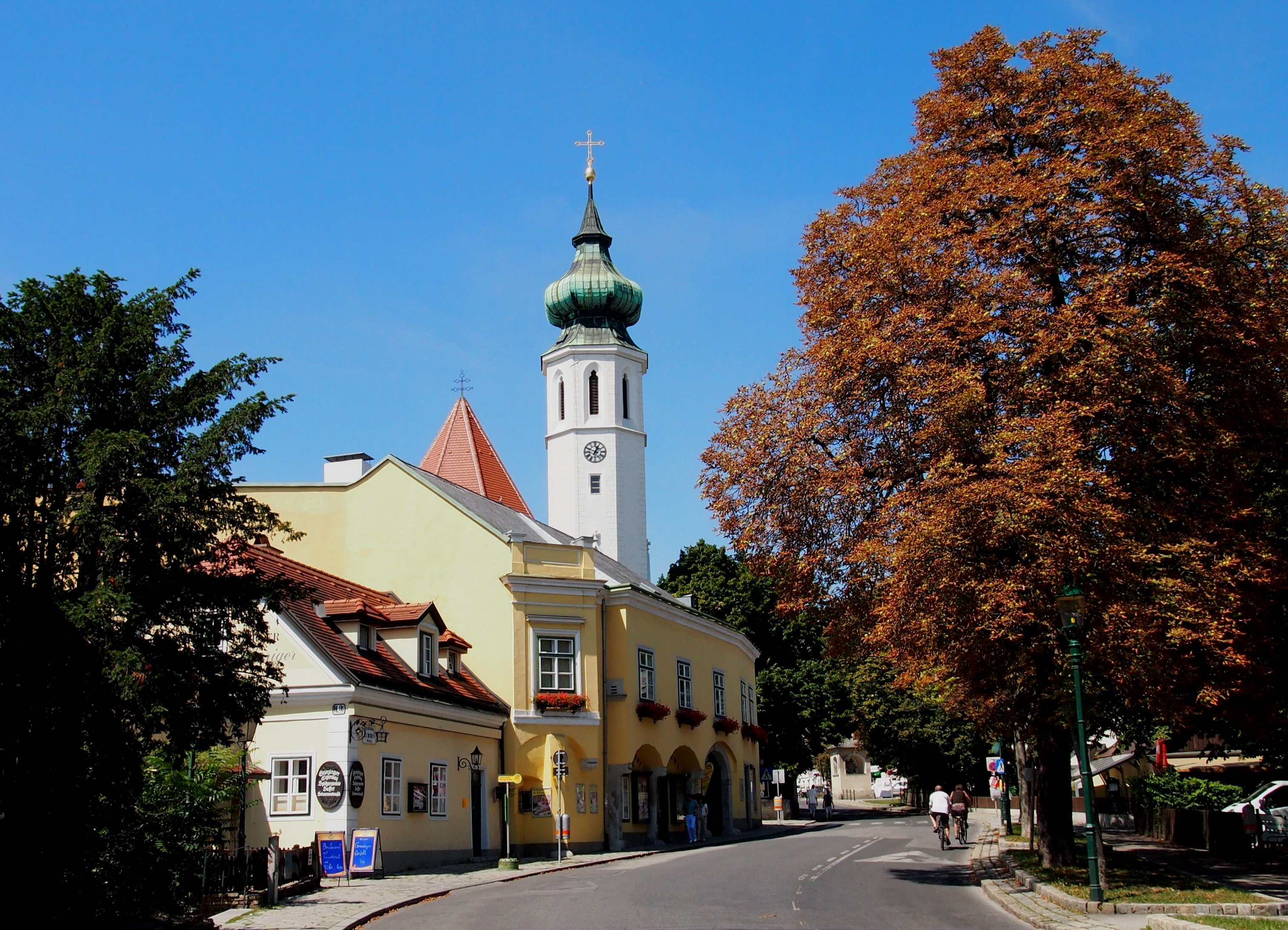
The centre of Grinzing with Grinzing Parish Church

The village of Grinzing came into the possession of the noble house Grunzinger in the 11th century. The Grunzinger built the Trummelhof, the remains of which can still be seen in the house at number 30 in the Cobenzlgasse. This former manor was supposedly thus named (Trümmer = rubble, Hof = court, yard) because it was built on top of Roman ruins.

The village was inhabited primarily by vintners and day labourers, who served land-owning monasteries and rich members of Vienna’s bourgeoisie. In the 14th century, the last of the Grunzinger, Rüdiger von Gründsing, died, and in 1350 he was buried in the Minoritenkirche in Vienna. Thereafter, Grinzing fell within the jurisdiction of the Klosterneuburg Monastery, which retained its authority over the area into the 19th century. The Grinzing Parish Church "Zum heiligen Kreuz" (The Holy Cross) was erected in 1426.

Grinzing suffered greatly in the centuries following the Middle Ages. In 1484, Matthias Corvinus laid waste to the village, while in 1529 the Ottoman Turks inflicted heavy damage. In 1604, a major fire destroyed sections of the village and in 1683 the Turks once again ruined the newly reconstructed houses. Grinzing nonetheless developed better than its neighbours. In 1713, there were 70 houses, but the plague hit the village hard. More than half of these houses were infected, and 129 people died. This seriously stunted the village’s growth.

In 1783, the church in Grinzing was elevated to the status of a parish church; it was financed through the dissolution of several religious orders in the area by Joseph II. However, the pace of development in the village remained slow in the following decades. In 1795, there were 83 houses. In 1822 there were 99 houses but there were no further additions until 1835. In 1831, Grinzing numbered 99 houses with 835 inhabitants and was thus barely larger than it had been in 1795. The rate of growth increased after the 1830s, and by 1890, the population had grown to 1,421 people in 209 houses.

In 1892, Grinzing was incorporated into the city of Vienna. The area as far as the Wienerwald ridge was included along with Oberdöbling, Unterdöbling, Kahlenbergerdorf, Nußdorf, Heiligenstadt, Sievering and Josefsdorf in the 19th district, Döbling, while the rest of Grinzing was allocated to Weidling.

Grinzing’s reputation is based on its vineyards and numerous Heurigen—the traditional cafes serving wine and must (grape juice) which remain a tourist attraction to this day.

== Economy ==
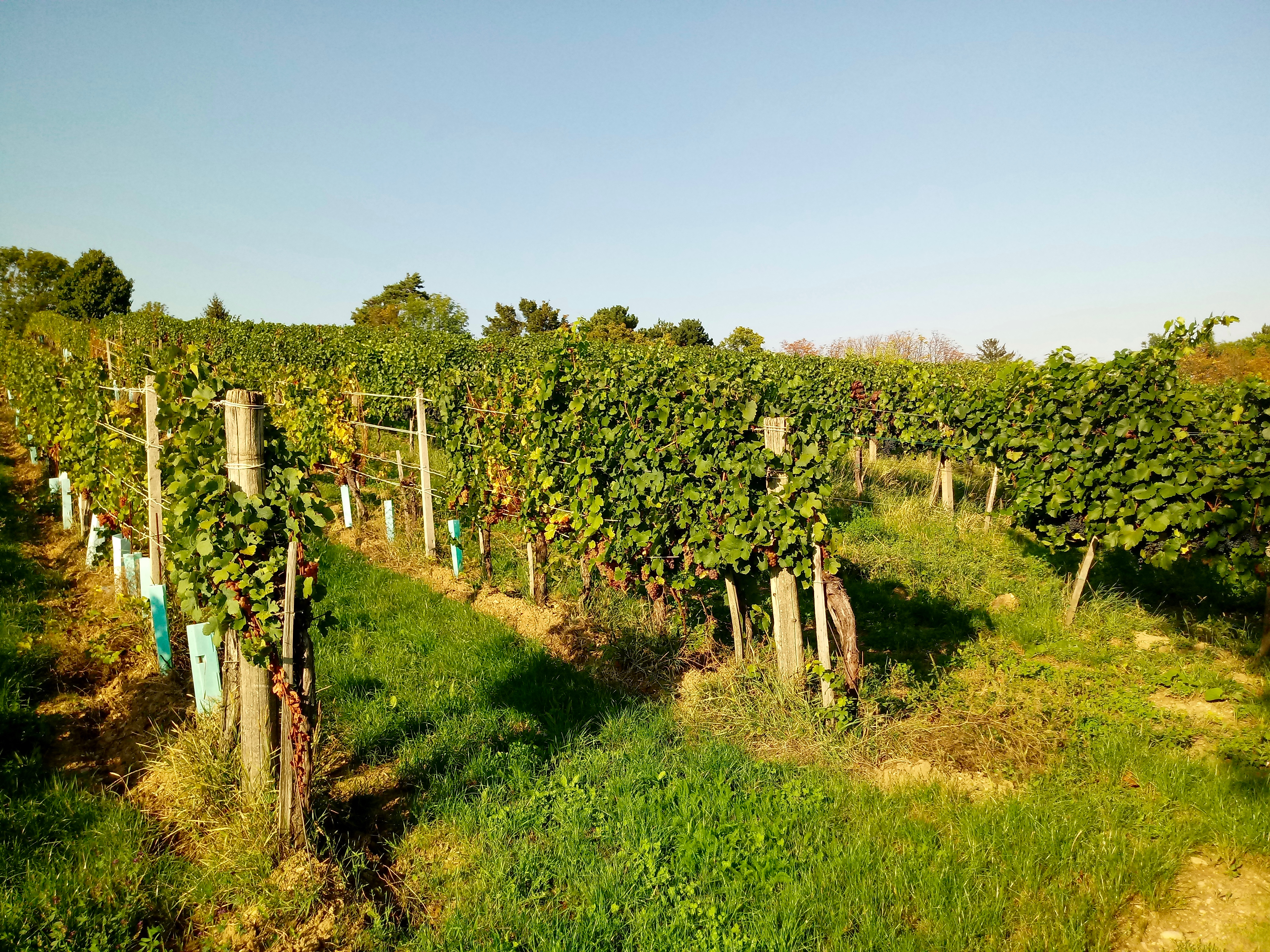
Riede Kleben vineyard in Grinzing

The traditional importance of viticulture and logging in the local economy during becomes evident when one examines the distribution of available land in Grinzing in 1826. At that time, 45 percent of the land was covered by the woodlands belonging to the Klosterneuburg Monastery. Another 23 percent was used for vineyards. Agriculture played a secondary role, covering barely 10 percent of the land. Beer production was also important at times; a brewery founded in the Trummelhof in 1814 operated intermittently until 1831.

== Sights ==
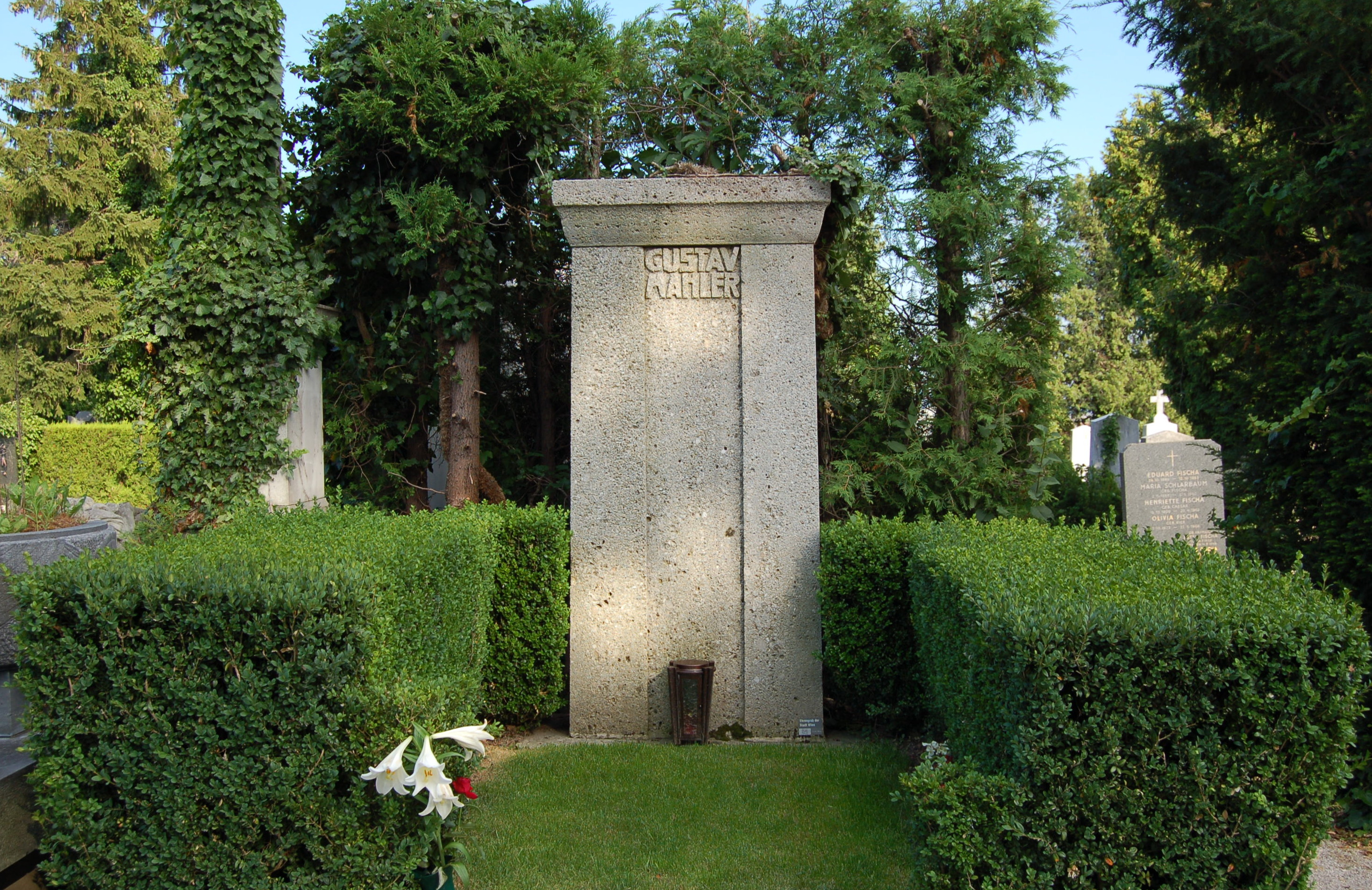
Gustav Mahler's grave in the Grinzing cemetery

In addition to Grinzing’s numerous Heurigen, the parish church and the Kaasgrabenkirche are worth a visit. The large area covered by the Wienerwald is home to the Habsburgwarte on the Hermannskogel hill as well as a monument to Karl Lueger and the “Cobenzl” restaurant on the Reisenberg hill.

The Grinzing Cemetery (Grinzinger Friedhof) is home to the graves of Julius Deutsch, Gustav Mahler, Alma Mahler-Werfel, Attila Hörbiger, Paula Wessely, Heimito von Doderer, Ida Krottendorf and Thomas Bernhard.
