= Philipp Frankfurter =

Philipp Frankfurter (c. 1450 – 1511) was a writer from Vienna. He collected the humorous tales surrounding the "Priest from Kahlenberg" (Pfaff vom [or von] Kalenberg), published with a frame story in verse form as Des pfaffen geschicht und histori vom Kalenberg. It was printed as early as 1472 or 1480 in Augsburg. The "Priest from Kahlenberg" is a folkloristic trickster or prankster figure. A 1490 edition was printed by Heinrich Knoblochtzer in Heidelberg.

The work was very popular, reprinted well into the 17th century, with translations to Low German, Dutch and English. The figure of the "priest from Kahlenberg" is also mentioned in the Ship of Fools by Sebastian Brant and in the Till Eulenspiegel chapbook. The figure also inspired the modern narrative poem Der Pfaff vom Kahlenberg by Anastasius Grün (1850).

The Pfaff von Kalenberg character is not named in Frankfurter's text. He is identified as one Gundacker von Thernberg by Ladislaus Sunthaym in 1486/1501. An alternative name for the character, Wigend (also Wigand, Weigand) von Theben is an invention by Wolfgang Lazius, but was reported as the name of the historical character well into the 20th century. Gundacker von Thernberg is recorded as parish priest in Kahlenbergerdorf, a village north of Vienna, for the period of 1339 to 1355, and later in Prigglitz, Lower Austria, where his name has been found on the fragment of a tombstone. Alternatively, it has been suggested that Gundacker died already in the plague year of 1349.
