= Heiligenstadt station =

Heiligenstadt station could refer to the following:

- Heilbad Heiligenstadt station in Heilbad Heiligenstadt, Thuringia, Germany
- Heiligenstadt station (Vienna U-Bahn) in Vienna, Austria
- Wien Heiligenstadt railway station in Vienna, Austria
