= Döbling =

Döbling Döbling (Bavarian)
- 19th District of Vienna
- Coat of arms

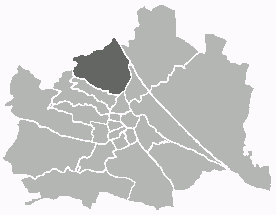
- Location of the district within Vienna
- Coordinates: 48°15′59″N 16°19′22″E
- Country: Austria
- City: Vienna

Government
  - District Director: Daniel Resch (ÖVP)
  - First Deputy: Robert Wutzl (ÖVP)
  - Second Deputy: Thomas Mader (SPÖ)
  - Representation (48 Members): ÖVP 17, SPÖ 13, Green 7, NEOS 6, FPÖ 6, KPÖ 1

Area
  - Total: 24.90 km^{2} (9.61 sq mi)

Population (2016-01-01)
  - Total: 71,596
  - Density: 2,875/km^{2} (7,447/sq mi)
- Postal code: A-1190
- Address of District Office: Grinzinger Allee 6 A-1190 Wien
- Website: www.wien.gv.at/bezirke/doebling

Döbling (German pronunciation: [ˈdøːblɪŋ]) is the 19th district in the city of Vienna, Austria (German: 19. Bezirk, Döbling, Doebling). It is located in the north of Vienna, north of the districts Alsergrund and Währing. Döbling has some heavily populated urban areas with many residential buildings, and borders the Vienna Woods. It includes some of the most expensive residential areas such as Grinzing, Sievering, and Neustift am Walde, and is home to many Heurigen taverns. There are some large Gemeindebauten, including Vienna's most famous, the Karl-Marx-Hof.

== Geography ==
=== Location ===
Döbling is located in the northwest of Vienna and spans the slope of the Wienerwald (Vienna Woods) to the Danube and the Donaukanal (lit. 'Danube Canal') that make up the border of the district in the east. The Danube forms the border between Döbling and the district Floridsdorf, and the Canal forms the border to the district Brigittenau. At the Gürtel Bridge, crossing the Donaukanal, the district border turns southwest and separates Döbling in the south along Gürtel Road (lit. 'Belt Road') from the district Alsergrund. At Schrottenbachgasse the district turns towards the northwest and separates Döbling from the district Währing along the line Währinger Park–Hasenauerstraße–Peter-Jordan-Straße–Starkfriedgasse–Sommerhaidenweg. There is then a short stretch of border to the district Hernals at the edge of Vienna. In the northwest, the district borders on the municipality of Klosterneuburg, Lower Austria.

Nearly 32.6% of the Döbling district area is urban (compared to Vienna citywide as 33.3%). Of this, 85.2% is for housing, whilst only 2.2% of the district is taken up by businesses, which is very low compared to other districts (Vienna 7.6%). With 51.8% of the district green space (48.3% for Vienna), Döbling is the fifth greenest district of Vienna. Agricultural land accounts for 14.9% of district land, with vineyards playing the biggest role around Grinzing, Nußdorf, Sievering, Neustift am Walde, and Salmannsdorf. A further 25.4% of the district is forested, plus 5.3% for meadows, 2.7% for small gardens, 2.5% for parks, and 0.9% as sports and recreational areas. Of the remaining district territory, 11.0% is taken up by transportation and 4.6% by bodies of water. While the proportion of water is higher in relation to the whole city of Vienna, the proportion of transportation is lower.

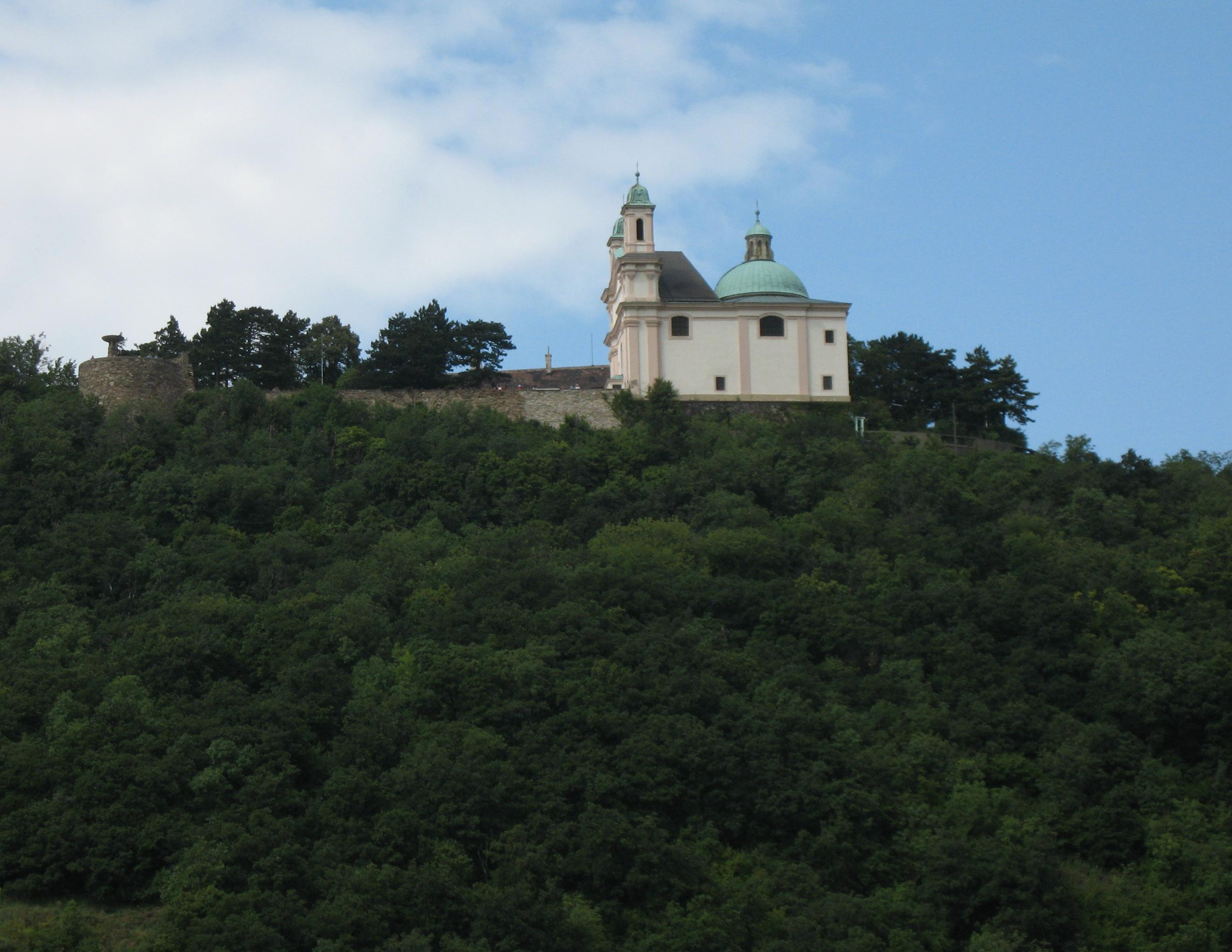
Leopoldsberg

=== Hills ===
Since the Vienna Woods make up a large portion of Döbling, numerous forested hills of Vienna are located within the district limits. Many lie on the border with Lower Austria and the neighboring districts. The highest summit is Hermannskogel (542 m, 1778 ft;) with an outlook tower; however, the symbols of Döbling are Kahlenberg (484 m, 1588 ft) with an outlook and a radio mast, and nearby Leopoldsberg (427 m, 1401 ft). Other hills in this region are: Reisenberg, Latisberg, Vogelsangberg, Dreimarkstein, and Nussberg. Besides, there are hills in partially built-up areas in Döbling, such as Hohe Warte in Heiligenstadt, Hungerberg in Grinzing, and Hackenberg in Sievering.

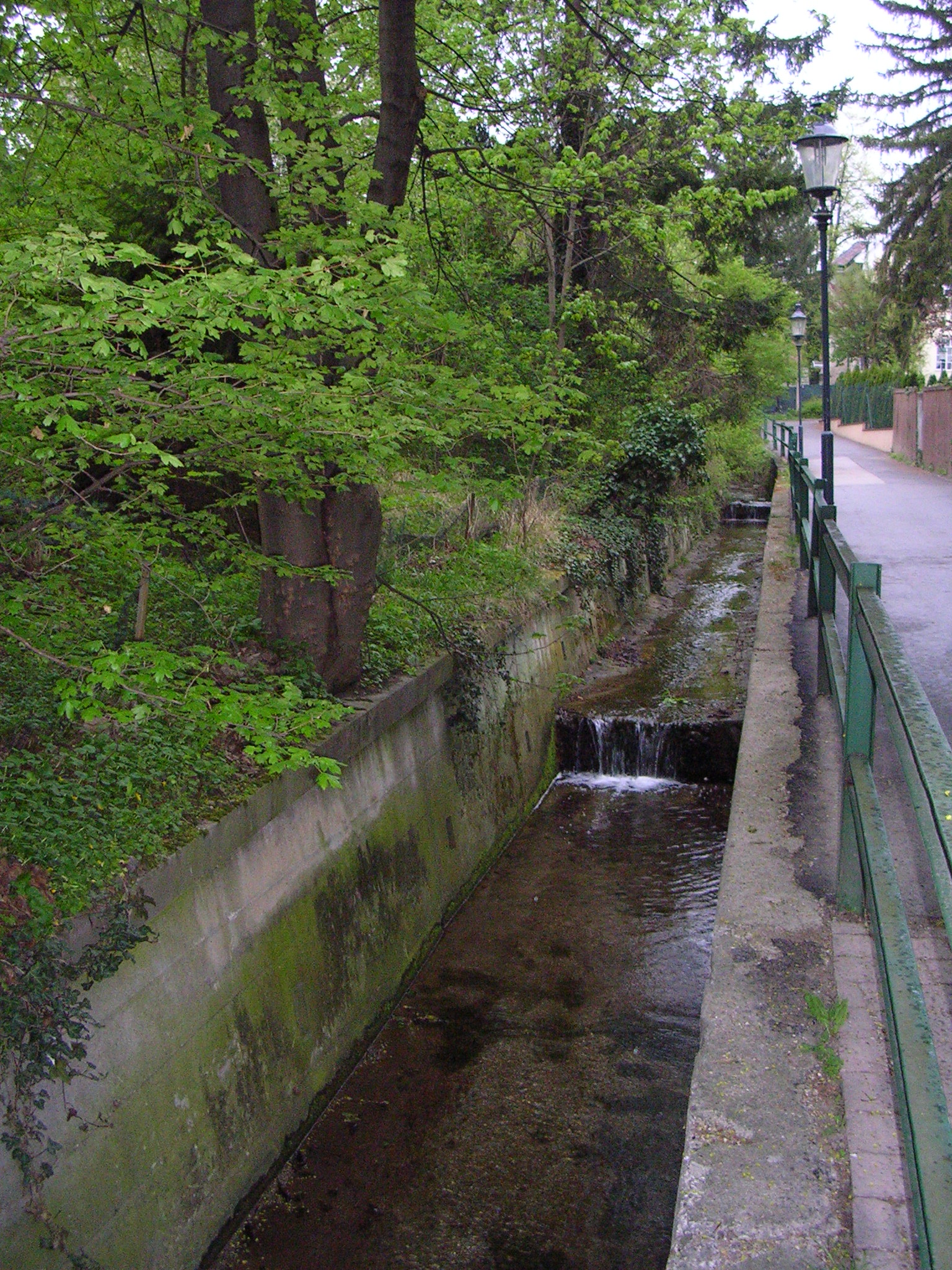
Schreiberbach stream before Nußdorf.

=== Watercourses ===
In the district, numerous streams originate, but are now mostly canalized or led underground in pipes. Originally they all flowed, with the exception of the Waldbach (forest stream), into the Danube Canal. Because the catchment areas of the streams lie in the sandstone zone of the Viennese forest, the streams can and were able to swell to a multiple of their normal water quantity, leading again and again to destructive flood waters, especially along the Krottenbach. Krottenbach was the most important stream in Döbling, and is now almost entirely led in pipes. In the area behind Billrothstraße Federal Secondary School, it absorbs the Arbesbach (Erbsenbach) stream that runs through Sievering, in its upper reaches still flowing openly until Obersievering.

Nesselbach passes to the Krapfenwaldl openly, before it unites underground with the Reisenbergbach stream in Grinzing. Reisenbergbach stream passes openly until shortly before the center of Grinzing. Almost entirely in the open, the Schreiberbach stream passes up to Nußdorf, as does the Waldbach stream at Kahlenbergerdorf.

The Döblinger Bach stream that originally sprang in the Cottage area and flowed into the Danube Canal at Spittelau has entirely disappeared because its water has been diverted.

== District sectors ==
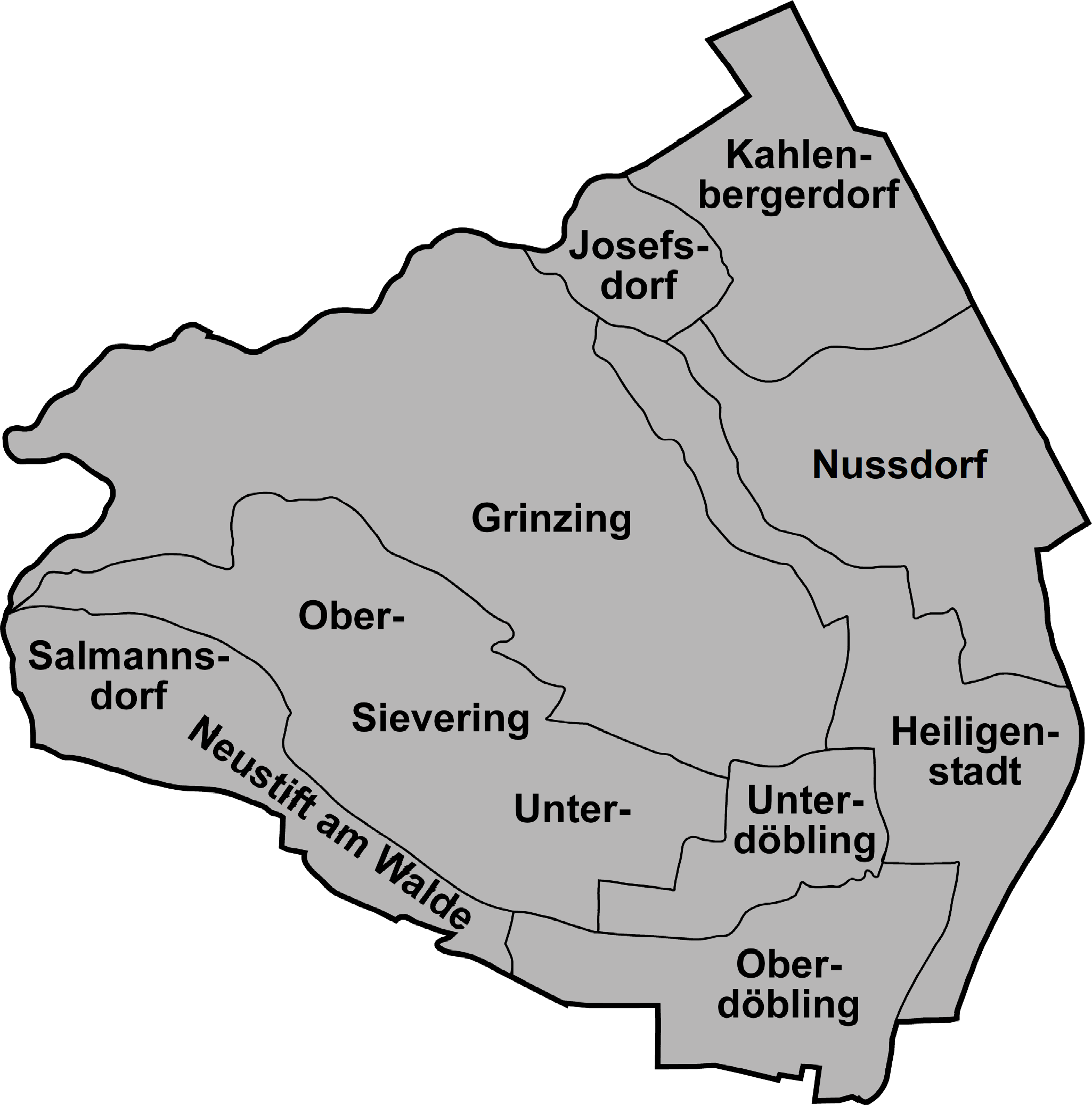
Döbling map of district sectors

Döbling was composed of these formerly independent municipalities:

- Grinzing
- Heiligenstadt
- Josefsdorf
- Kahlenbergerdorf
- Neustift am Walde

- Nußdorf
- Oberdöbling
- Salmannsdorf
- Sievering
- Unterdöbling.

== History ==
=== Etymology ===
Döbling was first mentioned in 1114 as "de Teopilic". The name derives from the Slavic * topl'ika ("swampy waters" or "swampy place"). The name "Döbling" relates to the lake of the Krottenbach stream, while further possibility of interpretation derives from Old Slavic Toplica ( "warm stream"). Later spellings of the place-name were for example Toblich, Töbling and Tepling. In the formation of the district 1890/92, the name was finally "Döbling", from the largest municipality, Oberdöbling, in the incorporated district.

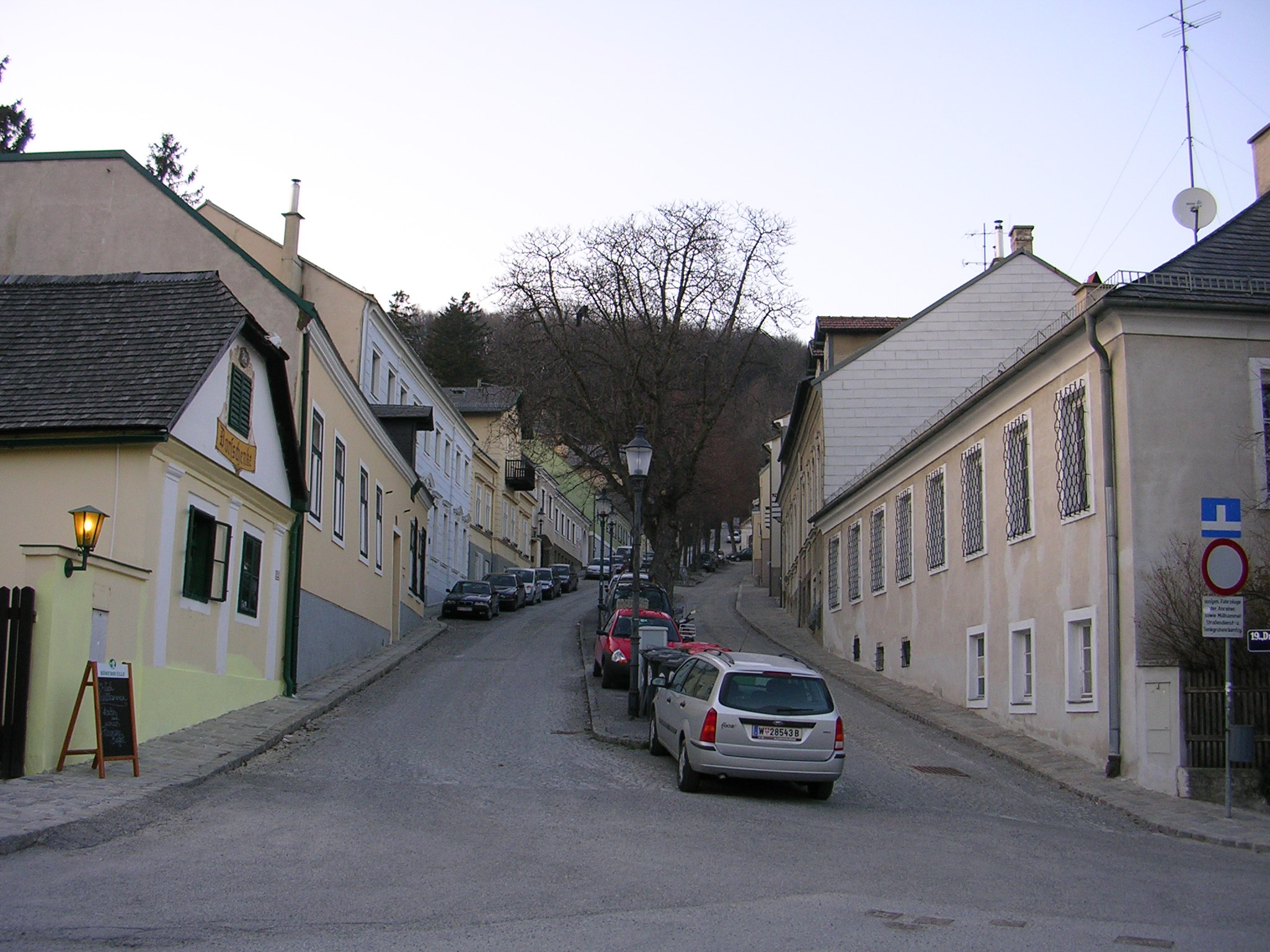
Dreimarksteingasse (street), center of town Salmannsdorf.

=== Döbling in antiquity ===
The district Döbling had been inhabited over 5,000 years ago, with the area Döbling–Nußdorf–Heiligenstadt (aside from the area Simmering-Landstraße) probably as oldest settlement area in the Vienna area. Known is that on the Leopoldsberg hill, an armed village with a fortified tower existed where the inhabitants of surrounding villages took refuge in the case of risk. Little is known about the residents of that time; science refers to them as members of "Donauländische" (Danube-land) culture. They were not, however, Indo-Germanic. Indo-European peoples only arrived into the Vienna area one thousand years later, when the resident population mixed with the immigrant Illyrians and Celtic people.

In the last years of the 1st century BC, the Vienna area became part of the Roman Empire. Starting in 9 AD, it belonged to Pannonia province. The activities of the Romans, at the current site of Döbling, are documented by several findings, such as: in Heiligenstadt, a fortified tower of the limes (border wall); in Sievering, a Mithraeum temple was found; and excavations in Heiligenstadt's church revealed a Roman cemetery. In Sievering, a great quarry existed in Roman times, with a large worker settlement.

A major source of subsistence of the population was wine growing, which presumably already had been done before the Romans arrived. Otherwise, the people practised agriculture for their own needs.

=== Döbling in the Middle Ages ===
After the Romans left, little is known about further development of the villages in the area. The first mentions of the villages date back to the 12th century. Gradually, the later communities of Unterdöbling, Oberdöbling, Heiligenstadt, Nussdorf, Sievering, Kahlenbergerdorf, Josefsdorf, Salmannsdorf, and Neustift am Walde formed in the district area. There were also other settlements at times. In the 13th century there was a place called Chlaitzing (Glanzing) on the south-west slope of Hackenberg, about which only vineyards but no houses were mentioned in 1330. Along Hackhofergasse there was a small, one-line street village called Altes Urfar. Finally, there was even a place called Kogelbrunn on Hermannskogel in 1200, which was last mentioned in 1417.

=== Döbling in the Modern Era ===
The villages of Döbling were devastated several times during modern times. When the siege of Vienna by the army of Matthias Corvinus began in 1482, his soldiers also plundered the surrounding villages. In 1529, too, Turkish soldiers overran the villages of Döbling during the first Turkish siege of Vienna, killing numerous residents and kidnapping many as slaves. However, while the churches were looted, most of the villages survived. The Thirty Years' War also brought economic hardship. The slump in wine exports and the tax increases led to a severe impoverishment of the population. The great plague epidemic in 1679 claimed just as many victims in the villages as the second Turkish siege of Vienna that began in the summer of 1683. On July 13, the Ottoman vanguard, the Tatars, stormed and plundered the villages of Döbling. The liberation of Vienna was ultimately decided in the Battle of Kahlenberg on September 12, when the relief army, led by Jan Sobieski, advanced over the heights of the Vienna Woods in the rear of the Turkish besiegers.

In 1713 the plague came to Vienna again, with the towns of Sievering and Grinzing being particularly hard hit. While the numerous destructions and victims of the plague had hampered the development of the district area for a long time, a steady rise began in the second half of the 18th century. Due to the hilly terrain, large forested areas spread between the creeks and villages throughout the district, used as hunting grounds by the nobility. The topology also attracted wine growers. This combination increased the prosperity of the suburb, as noblemen built villas and hunting lodges whilst the burghers of Vienna relaxed at the Heurigen wine-gardens. The existing villages expanded, as the population increased. Oberdöbling in particular became attractive for the nobility and the Viennese citizens. Those who could afford it built a second home here. Similar to Hietzing, which benefited from its proximity to Schönbrunn Palace, the cornerstone for a special development of the suburb was laid here. Between 1765 and 1786, five new streets were built in Oberdöbling and four hunting lodges were built in what is now the area of the district.

The abolition of numerous orders by Joseph II also had an effect on the manors in Döbling. The confiscated assets of the Camaldolese (Kahlenberg), the Tulln nunnery (Oberdöbling) and the Gaming monastery (Untersievering) were used to set up the parishes of Nussdorf and Grinzing as well as the creation of the Döbling cemetery could be financed. The town of Josefsdorf also owes its existence to the abolition of the Camaldolese monastery on Kahlenberg. Through the parish reform of Joseph II, the parishes of Oberdöbling, Nussdorf and Neustift am Walde, which were now independent of Heiligenstadt, gained their independence.

=== Döbling in the 19th century ===
The Napoleonic Wars brought difficult times for the region. After the victory in the Battle of Ulm in 1805, the French army advanced to Vienna and the soldiers plundered the villages. Following the failed campaign against Bavaria, the French advanced again to Vienna in 1809, and so the communities were plundered again and had to feed the French soldiers.

After the Congress of Vienna, the regular surveying of the Döbling area began. The operations lasted from 1817 to 1819 and ended with the introduction of the cadastral communities and the fixing of the borders between the localities. The growth now ensured an initial upswing in trade and industry in the rural villages. At the same time, the villages of Döbling became popular excursion destinations for the Viennese. Above all, the Heurigen taverns and the Nussdorf brewery attracted visitors from Vienna and its suburbs.

During the Revolutions of 1848 in the Austrian Empire, Döbling remained on the fringes of events. On October 20, 1848, the district area was occupied by imperial troops, who built a bridge across the Danube from Nussdorf and shelled the opposite bank.

In the middle of the 19th century, the increasing popularity of summer resorts caused a real growth boom in the villages of Döbling. Due to the now additional need for living space, numerous residential buildings were built, and the population of the villages almost tripled within just forty years. This also led to a modernization of the infrastructure. The first gas lanterns were installed in Döbling in the mid-19th century, and the Döbling gasworks, built in 1856, supplied the area with gas.

=== Döbling becomes a district of Vienna ===
The 19th district of Vienna, Döbling, was founded at the end of the 19th century. While the suburbs of Vienna had already been incorporated in 1850, the discussion about the incorporation of the exurb localities also began in the 1870s. Although these towns opposed this step, the Landtag of Lower Austrian (the state parliament) decided to unify Vienna with its exurb areas after Emperor Franz Joseph I had announced this wish in 1888 in a speech that caused a stir in Währing. The corresponding law of December 19, 1890 was implemented by January 1, 1892 and united Unterdöbling, Oberdöbling, Grinzing (up to the crest of the Wienerwald, the rest becoming part of Weidling), Heiligenstadt, Nussdorf, Sievering, Kahlenbergerdorf (with the exception of the northern part of the mountain that was appended to Klosterneuburg), Josefsdorf and part of Weidling (Fischerhaus, Jägerwiese, Schutzhaus Hermannskogel) into the 19th district of Vienna. Due to the size of Oberdöbling, which had almost as many inhabitants as the rest of the district, there was no discussion about the name of the new district, Döbling. By that time, the places in the district had also largely grown together.

=== Döbling up to Second World War ===
The development of the area between Döbling and Währing had already begun in 1872. An elegant residential area emerged, the so-called first "Viennese Cottage". Döbling developed as a district for the prosperous middle and upper class. On the other hand, the area between Heiligenstädter Strasse and the Danube Canal was dedicated as an industrial area. By 1895, the canalisation of the Döbling streams was also completed. They no longer flowed into the Danube Canal, but into the main collection sewer, which ran parallel to the Danube Canal. The creeks now largely disappeared from the surface and were used as creek channels to improve the sewage system. After the completion of the Second Viennese spring water pipeline in 1910, most of the houses were also connected to the water pipeline. Previously people had only been supplied with water from wells and drinking water trucks.

The gas supply for the district area had already begun in 1856 through the ICGA gasworks, an English company. In 1911 the City of Vienna took over the supply and the works in Oberdöbling were demolished.

After the First World War, the creation of affordable and adequate living space became extremely important, which is why the city government—now dominated by the Social Democrats—began building cheap municipal housing in huge numbers throughout the city and also in Döbling. In 1923, the first municipal residential building (Gemeindebau) with 60 apartments was built in Schegargasse, and by 1930 the city had invested in the construction of 2,801 apartments. The largest and best-known project was Karl-Marx-Hof, stretching for 1.1 km (0.68 mi) between Heiligenstädter Strasse and Franz Joseph Railway. In addition, the Social Democrats tried to improve social welfare through numerous institutions.

Fighting during the February Uprising in 1934 was particularly heavy in the district. The main battle area was Karl-Marx-Hof. The building was shelled with artillery for two days, and three other municipal buildings were stormed by army forces. After the uprising was crushed, the Social Democratic Party was banned and the previously Social Democratic District Director of Döbling was removed from office.

In order to alleviate unemployment caused by the Great depression, the federal government began building Wiener Höhenstraße in 1934. The road led from Cobenzl to Kahlenberg and then to Klosterneuburg.

After National Socialist Germany had annexed Austria in March 1938, the district boundaries of Vienna were reorganized. This also affected Döbling, as Neustift am Walde with Glanzing and Salmannsdorf were transferred from Währing to Döbling.

Otherwise, however, the rule of the National Socialists primarily brought suffering to the approximately 4,000 Jews in Döbling (7% of the district population). During the November pogroms on November 10, 1938, the Döbling synagogue in Dollergasse 3 was destroyed. The 2,030 registered Jews remaining in Döbling in May 1939 were gradually deported to the concentration camps. During the war, around 5,000 people from Döbling had to enlist, and not much more than half of them returned.

Bombings in World War II hit the district area for the first time on July 8, 1944. 12% of the 20,960 homes were destroyed or made uninhabitable. The area around the train station in Heiligenstadt and Hohe Warte were particularly hard hit.

=== Döbling after World War II ===
On April 8, 1945, Soviet troops, coming from Klosterneuburg, invaded the district via Heiligenstädter Strasse and occupied it completely by April 9. Karl Mark was appointed first District Director of the Second Austrian republic by the army commander. During the following years, the district largely lost its character as a mix of residential areas and workplaces. More and more companies left the district, while the number of apartments rose from 20,000 after the end of the war to 39,608 apartments (2001). This development also meant that two thirds of the district population had to commute to work in other parts of the city or in the surrounding area.

The City of Vienna was also significantly active in construction work, building around 7,000 additional municipal flats by 1985. The largest municipal building of the post-war period in Döbling is Kopenhagen Hof ("Copenhagen courtyard") built between 1956 and 1959 on the former site of Döbling brewery, housing 436 apartments. The Krim, part of Oberdöbling, also experienced a special boom. The once disreputable slum has been developed into a high-quality residential area with its own parish. Another important building is Pressehaus (press building) in Muthgasse, completed in 1963 (headquarters of Kronen Zeitung). The most important construction project at the moment is construction works on grounds around the Hohe Warte stadium.

In the 1990s, the district borders were changed twice: in 1995 concerning borders to the municipal districts of Hernals and Währing, and in 1996 to the district of Brigittenau. The latter border change meant an area gain for Döbling, which since then borders directly on the Danube Canal.

== Demography ==
=== Population development ===
In 1832, 6,438 people lived in the district area. Due to the growth of the suburbs in the 19th century, the population doubled within 20 years and tripled by 1890. The number of residents continued to rise sharply until the First World War and after the war further increased due to the construction of municipal housing. Residential construction ensured growth in the district up until the 1980s. After that, the district population began to decrease slightly due to the increased housing needs until 2001, and since then has increased slightly again in the Vienna-wide trend, to 69,924 inhabitants at the beginning of 2015. Further developing to 76,074 as of January 2025.

=== Population structure ===
The Döbling population as of 2024 has an average age of 44 years, above the Viennese average of 41. The proportion of people who are 65 years and older is 21.5%. One possible cause for Döbling's aging population is the high proportion of retirement homes in Döbling. The proportion of women in the population is above average at 53.1% (in Vienna it is only 51%).

=== Origin and language ===
The proportion of Döbling residents with foreign citizenship was 13.1% in 2003, around 4 percentage points below the Vienna average. 2% of Döbling residents were citizens of Serbia or Montenegro, 1.6% were German citizens. They are followed by Turks (1.2%) as well as Poles, Bosniaks, Croats, and Hungarians, but their share of the population is only between 0.5 and 0.3%. In total, around 20% of Döbling residents were born in another country in 2001, which is why only 82.8% of Döblingers said German was their everyday language. Another 2.8% spoke mainly Serbian, 1.6% Turkish, 1.2% Croatian, and 1.1% Hungarian.

=== Religious preferences ===
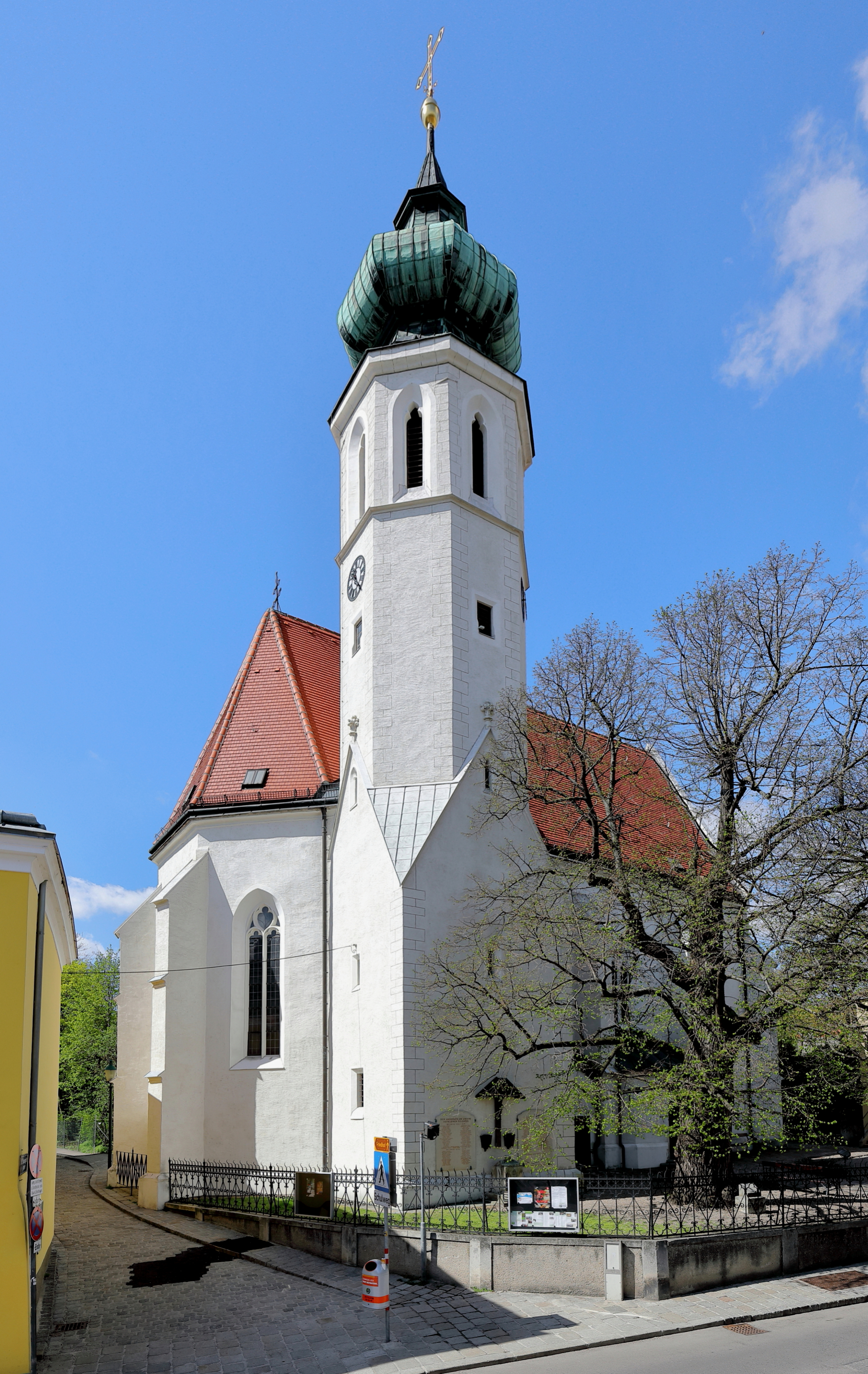
Roman Catholic parish church in Grinzing

The distribution of religious preferences of the population in the 19th District, in 2001, differed most from the average in Vienna. With 55.7% of residents being Roman Catholic (Vienna: 49.2%), it is the second highest of all districts of Vienna. There are 11 districts of Roman Catholic parishes, which together constitute the City Deanery 19 (Stadtdekanat 19). Also, the percentage of people with Protestant religion reached 6.5%, as one of the highest portions among the districts in Vienna. The proportion of people adhering to Islam are 4.0%, and 3.2% for Eastern Orthodoxy. About 23.8% said they had no religious denomination.

== Politics ==
District Directors from 1945
Josef Friedl	1891–1894	Karl Mark (SPÖ)	4/45–10/45
Johann Österreicher	1894–1895	Karl Schwendner (SPÖ)	10/45–1960
Peter Langweber	1895–1903	Franz Opfermann (SPÖ)	1960–1965
Wenzel Kuhn	1903–1919	Franz Weber (SPÖ)	1965–1975
Josef Seleskowitsch	1919–1934	Richard Stockinger (SPÖ)	1975–1978
Franz Karasek	1934–1938	Adolf Tiller (ÖVP)	1978–2018
Adolf Judex	1938–1939	Daniel Resch (ÖVP)	2018–present

In the 2020 District Council elections (Bezirksvertretungswahl) the ÖVP won 36.9% of the vote. Second came the SPÖ, with 26.9%. The Greens won 16.0%, NEOS 9.8%, and the FPÖ 5.1%. Of the 48 seats in the District Council, ÖVP gained 19 seats, SPÖ 14, The Greens 8, NEOS 5, and FPÖ 2. Other parties won less than 2% each and gained no seats in the Council.

District Director is Daniel Resch, of ÖVP.

== Economy and infrastructure ==
=== Economy history ===
For centuries, the economy of the district area was shaped by viticulture. Until the second half of the 19th century, the livelihood of the residents was based on the cultivation and sale of wine. In addition, milk, eggs, meat, fruit and vegetables were delivered to Vienna. There were smaller mills along the streams and windmills on the hills. The Sievering quarry, which was under the authority of the Vienna municipal authority, was also of importance.

From the middle of the 18th century, the first larger commercial and industrial companies settled in the district area, especially in Nussdorf, Heiligenstadt, and Oberdöbling. From 1800 a number of companies in the textile, leather and chemical industries emerged. Breweries were also founded in Grinzing, Nussdorf and Oberdöbling in the first half of the 19th century, with the one in Nussdorf in particular experiencing a significant boom. Dairy farming remained important until the First World War, after which this branch of the economy disappeared rapidly. Instead, the importance of Heurigen inns increased. In contrast to those in the surrounding districts, these were able persist, also because the steep terrain in Döbling was less suitable for construction.

From the beginning of the 20th century, the Gräf & Stift automobile factory in Sievering was one of the most important industrial production companies. In Unterdöbling the Zacherl insect powder factory gained great significance. Another important company was the Heinrich machine factory in Heiligenstadt. After the Second World War, the characteristics of the district changed. More and more manufacturing companies (including Inführ Sekt, which moved to Klosterneuburg) left the district.

The Kattus and Schlumberger sparkling wine producers are among the best-known companies that still exist.

There are two markets in Döbling, Nussdorfer Markt and Sonnbergmarkt.

Q19 Döbling shopping centre is located in Heiligenstadt near Heiligenstadt railway and subway station.

=== Traffic ===
==== Public transport ====
Public transport in Döbling was established in 1811 when a Stellwagen trolley line between Freyung and the Heiligenstadt baths went into service. Other lines to Oberdöbling, Grinzing and Sievering followed. The Stellwagen were horse-drawn wagons with about a dozen seats. In 1869 Oberdöbling was connected to Vienna by the fifth line of the Wiener Pferdetramway (Vienna Horsetram); further lines followed. These lines were adapted to electric traction in the first years of the 20th century. Between 1885 and 1903 a steam tramway also ran from the Döblinger Gürtel to Nussdorf. In 1874 a rack railway was opened from Nussdorf on the Kahlenberg, followed in 1898 by the opening of the Wiener Stadtbahn (then a steam powered railway line) with stations in Ober-Döbling, Unterdöbling and Heiligenstadt.

The most important connections by Wiener Linien in the district today are tram lines 37 (Hohe Warte), 38 (Grinzing) and D (Nussdorf) as well as the bus lines 35A (Salmannsdorf), 38A (Kahlenberg), 39A (Sievering) and 40A (Döblinger Friedhof). In addition, since 1976 Döbling has had a stake in the U4 subway line (Heiligenstadt), with Heiligenstadt railway and subway station becoming an important rail and bus junction in the direction of Klosterneuburg. Döbling also has a connection to the S45 S-Bahn line via Heiligenstadt and the Oberdöbling and Krottenbachstrasse stations.

==== Road traffic ====
The paving of the streets in the area began on a large scale in the last third of the 19th century and continued after the founding of the district. Many trees and avenues were sacrificed to road construction.

The most famous street in Döbling is the Höhenstrasse ascending to Kahlenberg and Leopoldsberg. Important connecting and thoroughfare roads are Krottenbachstrasse, Billrothstrasse, Döblinger Hauptstrasse, Heiligenstädter Strasse, Grinzinger Strasse and Sieveringer Strasse.

==== Air traffic ====
After the Second World War, there was a US Army airfield of the along the Danube Canal, which was closed in 1955.

=== Health services ===
Private hospitals in Döbling are:

- Rudolfinerhaus, in Billrothstrasse;
- Privatklinik Döbling, in Heiligenstädter Strasse.

=== Education ===
==== Primary and secondary schools ====
In Döbling, there are various public as well as private primary schools and lower secondary schools (Hauptschulen and Middle schools). There is also the privately run Training Institute for Kindergarten Education (Bildungsanstalt für Kindergartenpädagogik) "Maria Regina".

As of grammar schools, in 1890 only the Communal-Gymnasium in Gymnasiumstrasse existed. In 1914, the Staats-Realschule in Krottenbachstrasse was opened and in later years two more gymnasiums in Billrothstrasse went into service.

Three schools offer the Vienna Bilingual Schooling educational program, namely Volksschule (primary school) Grinzinger Strasse, Hauptschule In der Krim, and secondary level of Realgymnasium Krottenbachstrasse.

In Salmannsdorf, American International School Vienna is a private school offering education especially for pupils of foreign countries from pre-kindergarten to high school level.

A branch of the City of Vienna Music School is operated in Döblinger Hauptstrasse.

==== Higher education ====
University institutions settled in the district at the end of the 19th century. In 1896, what was later to be the University of Natural Resources and Life Sciences Vienna was opened on Linnéplatz. In 1916 the k.k. Export Academy, which had been founded in 1898, was moved to Franz-Klein-Gasse. It was promoted to University of World Trade in 1919, renamed the Vienna University of Economics and Business in 1975 and relocated to the 9th district in 1982. However, some facilities of the University of Economics remained in the building after the university had moved. It is now mainly used by the University of Vienna; The Institute for Prehistory and Early History and the Institute for Classical Archeology are located here. The Center for Translation Studies of the University of Vienna is located in the part of the building bordering on Gymnasiumstrasse. In 2007, the Modul University Vienna, a private university of the Vienna Chamber of Commerce with English as the language of instruction, was opened on Kahlenberg.

Lauder Business School, located in Hofzeile, is an English-language business school, operating as a "University of Applied Sciences" in the Austrian education system.

==== Adult education ====
Wiener Volkshochschulen (Vienna Folk high schools) have event centres in Oberdöbling (Gatterburggasse) and Heiligenstadt (Heiligenstädter Strasse). The Vienna public libraries also operate branches nearby.

== Notable residents ==
- Ludwig van Beethoven (1770–1827), composer (Grinzinger Straße 64; Pfarrplatz 2; Probusgasse 6 (the Heiligenstadt Testament was drafted here); Döblinger Hauptstraße 92 (Beethoven composed substantial parts of the Eroica Symphony here)
- Elias Canetti (1905–1994), writer, Nobel Prize in Literature 1981 (Himmelstraße 30)
- Kurt Gödel (1906–1978), Austrian-American mathematician, logician and philosopher (Himmelstraße 43)
- Mohamed ElBaradei (born 1942), former Director General of the International Atomic Energy Agency (IAEA), Nobel Peace Prize laureate
- Franz Grillparzer (1791–1872), poet (Grinzinger Straße 64)
- Bruno Kreisky (1911, Margareten, Vienna - 1990), former Chancellor of Austria (Armbrustergasse 15)
- Joseph Lanner (1801, Neubau, Vienna - 1843), composer (Gymnasiumstraße 87, building demolished in the late 19th century)
- Nikolaus Lenau (1802–1850), author
- Koloman Moser (1868, Wieden, Vienna - 1918), founding member of the Vienna Secession movement
- Helmut Qualtinger (1928, Alsergrund, Vienna - 1986), actor
- Romy Schneider (1938–1982), actress
- Johann Strauss I (1804–1849), composer (Dreimarksteingasse 13)
- Johann Strauss II (1825–1899), composer (Dreimarksteingasse 13)
- István Széchenyi (1791-1860), Hungarian politician (Oberdöbling asylum)
- Hussein bin Talal, King of Jordan (1935–1999)
- Ambros Rieder (1771–1855), composer, organist (born in Döbling) (de)
- Leon Trotsky (1879–1940), Marxist theorist and Bolshevik revolutionary (Rodlergasse 25)
- Franz Vranitzky (born 1937), former Austrian Chancellor
- Franz Werfel (writer) and his wife, Alma Mahler-Werfel
- Simon Wiesental (1908–2005), Nazi hunter
- Hugo Wolf (1860–1903), composer
- Hedwig “Hedy” Kiesler a/k/a Hedy Lamarr (born November 9, 1914; died January 19, 2000), actress, inventor (Peter-Jordan Strasse)

== Sights ==
- Grinzing
- Karl-Marx-Hof

== Sports ==
First Vienna F.C. are based in the district. Established on 22 August 1894, it is the country's oldest team and has played a notable role in the history of the game in Austria. They play at the Hohe Warte Stadium in Heiligenstadt, home of Vienna Vikings American football team.
