= Nußdorf, Vienna =

Suburb of Döbling, Vienna, Austria

Nußdorf
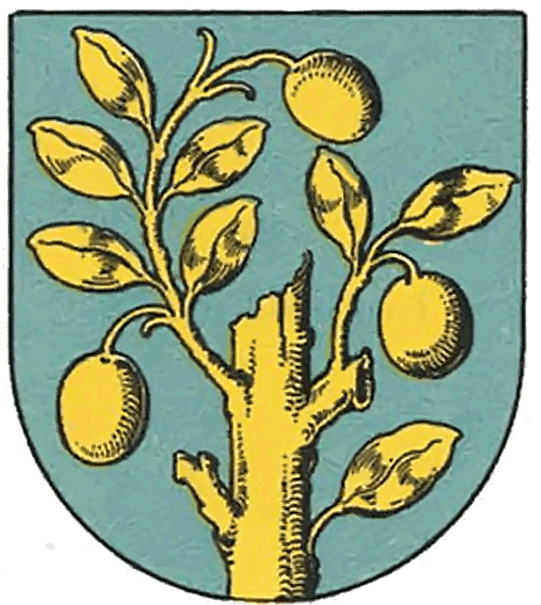
- Coat of arms

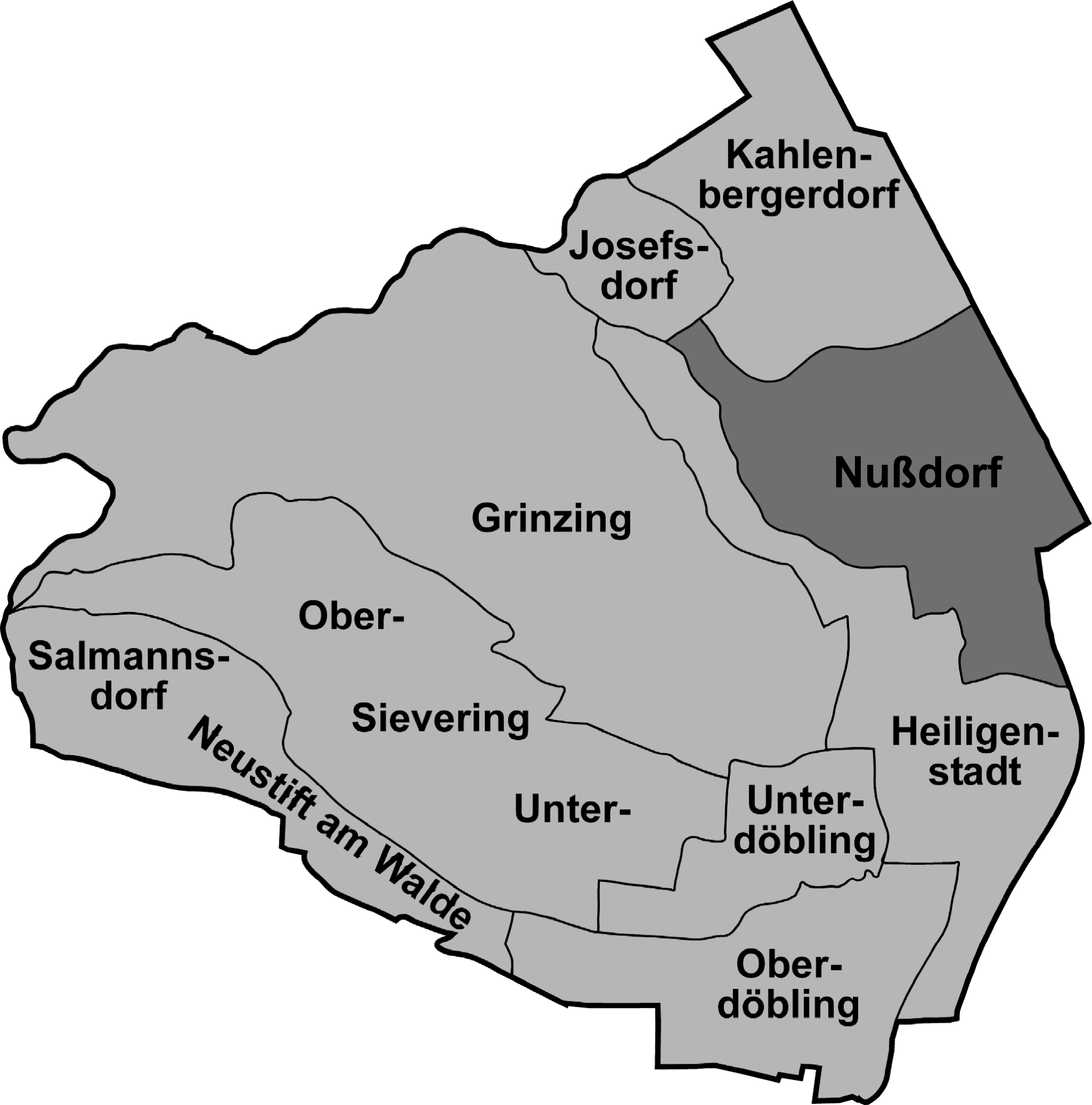
- Interactive map of Nußdorf

Nußdorf (German pronunciation: [ˈnʊsdɔʁf]; Central Bavarian: Nussduaf) was a separate municipality until 1892 and is today a suburb of Vienna in the 19th district of Döbling.

== Geography ==
=== Location ===
Nußdorf lies on both banks of the Nußbach (Schreiberbach), where the brook meets the Danube Canal. The district extends in the south as far as the Grinzingerstraße, in the north along the Heiligenstädter Straße and the bank of the Danube up to the border to Kahlenbergerdorf. Originally, the settlement (Alt-)Urfahr also lay within this area.

== History ==
=== Origin of the name ===
Nußdorf was officially mentioned for the first time in a deed from the Klosterneuburg Monastery from 1114 as Nuzdorf. The name Nußdorf (English: nut town) probably derives from the numerous nut trees and hazelnut shrubs that grew in the area as late as the beginning of the 19th century. However some also trace the name back to the Slavic word for miserable or meagre.

=== Nußdorf in the Middle Ages ===
Historians believe that the Greinergasse, which intersects with the Hammerschmidtgasse, the Sickenberggasse and the Kahlenberger Straße, formed the historical centre of Nußdorf, as these most closely resemble the structure of a medieval village. The inhabitants were farmers, who produced primarily for their own needs. Crab hunting and fishing were also practiced. Wine was cultivated for sale.

The lords of Nußdorf named themselves after the settlement from the 12th century onwards, but their line died out in the 14th century. The cultivation of wine was the most important source of income, and many convents and monasteries in this area, in particular the Klosterneuburg Monastery, owned vineyards early on in history. Viticulture was the source of Nußdorf's prosperity, but Nußdorf also profited from the Fährrecht, i.e. the right to transport goods and people over the Danube. The settlement Urfar arose for this reason on the bank of the Danube, but never consisted of more than a few huts, which served primarily to accommodate the ferrymen or travellers. The settlement was often flooded and was rendered redundant by the construction of the first large bridge over the Danube before disappearing completely.

=== Modern Nußdorf ===
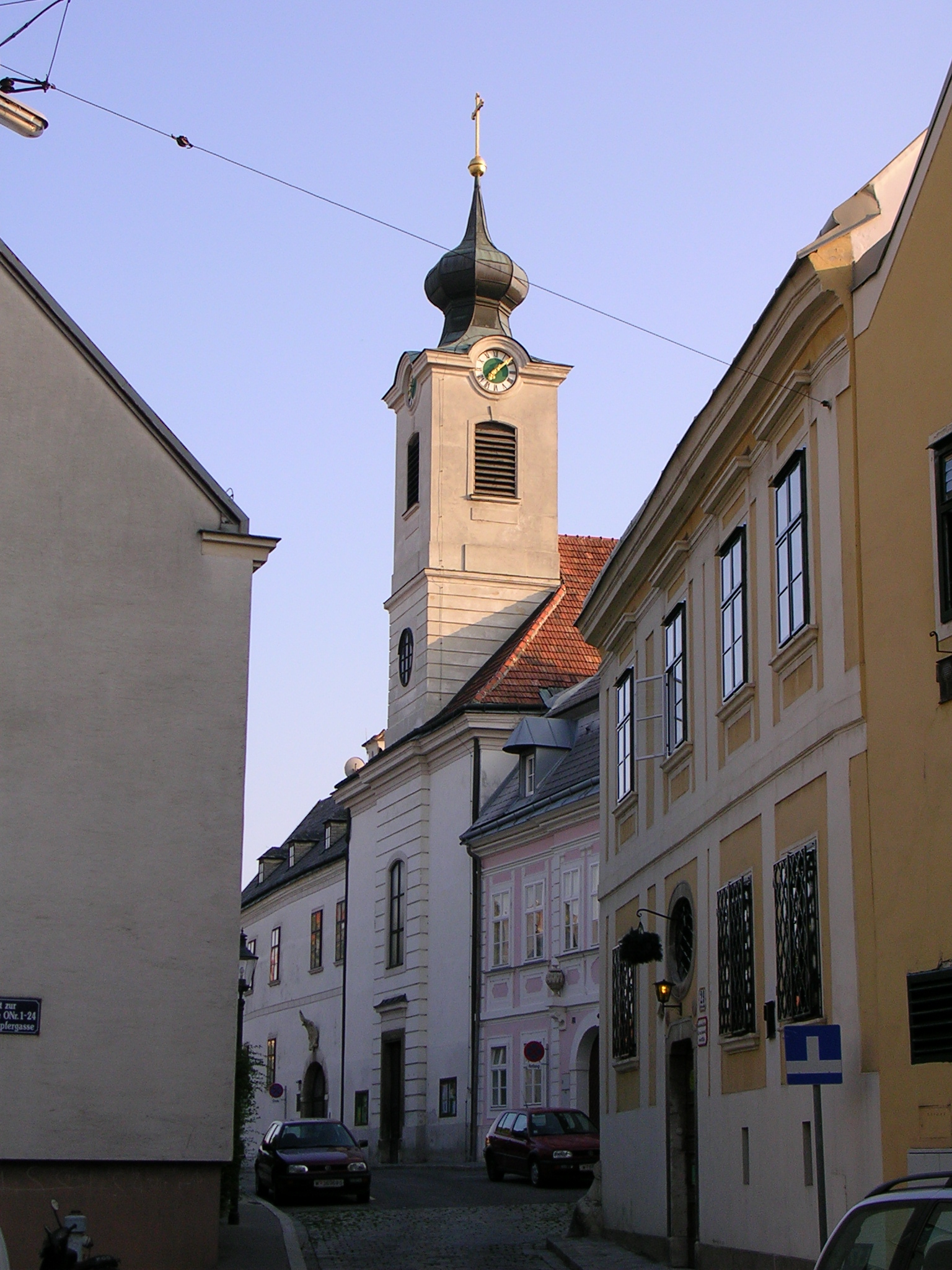
Nußdorf parish church

Nußdorf already had its own chapel in the 15th century, which was dedicated to the apostle Thomas. Nußdorf and the surrounding villages suffered heavily under the destruction caused by Hungarian troops in 1484, when Matthias Corvinus also built sconces in Nußdorf. The Ottoman wars in 1529 and 1683 and the looting carried out by the French in 1805 and 1809 also caused serious damage. Nußdorf was only with difficulty able to recover from each round of destruction, but over the years a number of buildings were nonetheless erected also for commercial purposes. These 15 freeholds belonged to members of the lower nobility who were exempt from property taxes. Nußdorf's parish church was built in 1787, financed through the appropriation of property belonging to several religious orders by Joseph II. Viticulture made the inhabitants of Nußdorf rich, and in 1820 more than half of the usable land in the area was covered with vineyards.

The Nußdorfer Brewery was erected in 1819 and the Franz Joseph railway to the Kahlenberg turned Nußdorf into a popular destination for daytrips for the Viennese in the 19th century. The population grew rapidly during this time. In 1795 Nußdorf consisted of 109 houses with 865 inhabitants; in 1808 there were already 120 houses and 1,265 inhabitants. By 1832 there were 152 houses and 1,503 inhabitants; in 1890 the number of inhabitants had grown to 5,191.

In 1892, Nußdorf and the neighbouring peripheral settlements of Sievering, Grinzing, Oberdöbling, Unterdöbling, Heiligenstadt and Kahlenbergerdorf were turned into a district of Vienna.

== Economy ==
At the beginning of the 19th century, viticulture was the dominant industry in Nußdorf. More than half of the usable land was covered with vineyards, a further 20 per cent with agricultural crops and fruit gardens. Yet for a long time, Nußdorf's ports formed the second pillar of the local economy. From the 16th century onwards, Nussdorf was the second most important port on the Danube in Vienna, because the channels further downstream were very thin. Goods arriving there on larger ships and rafts were transferred to smaller ships and brought to Vienna. Numerous inns and hostels were established in Nußdorf to cater to the traders staying there for longer periods of time, and a tollbooth was erected in 1675. The Nußdorfer Platz was the focus of commercial activity, which concerned above all the trade in cereals, salt, animals and animal products, fruit, and products made of clay and wood. The Kuchelauer docks, located further upstream near Kahlenbergerdorf, never attained the same importance, but as a result of the regulation of the Danube in 1870–1875, even the harbour in Nußdorf was rendered irrelevant.

At the end of the 18th century, the first industries arrived in Nußdorf. In 1783, a factory producing tartar and vinegar was founded, which made use of the produce and the residue created in the production of wine. The factory also manufactured rum and rubbing alcohol and exported to Russia and Bavaria. A state-financed salmiac and salt factory was erected in 1800, which processed the urine from the inns. This factory was also able to sell its produce abroad, but had to close in 1840. Other important industries included Ignaz Hackhofer's dye works and the Nußdorfer Brewery, which was founded in 1819 in the Hackhofergasse and which became one of the best-known industries in the district.

=== Nußdorfer Brewery ===
The brewery building was originally constructed by the Jesuits as a college for students of theology in 1690. Following the dissolution of the order in 1713, the building was first used to store weapons, before becoming private property. The industrialist Franz Xaver Bosch bought it in 1815 and founded the Nußdorfer Brewery in 1818. In 1842, a tower with a beer garden was added. After Bosch's death, his son-in-law Karl Adolf Freiherr Bachofen von Echt took over the enterprise. The brewery was expanded, obtained the status of a purveyor to the court, and exported its produce both to Europe and further abroad. The brewery was bought by the Schwechater Brewery in 1950, and everything but the facade, which had heritage status, was torn down in 1965 to make way for terraced houses.
