= Heiligenstadt, Vienna =

Coordinates: 48°15′18″N 16°21′30″E

Heiligenstadt
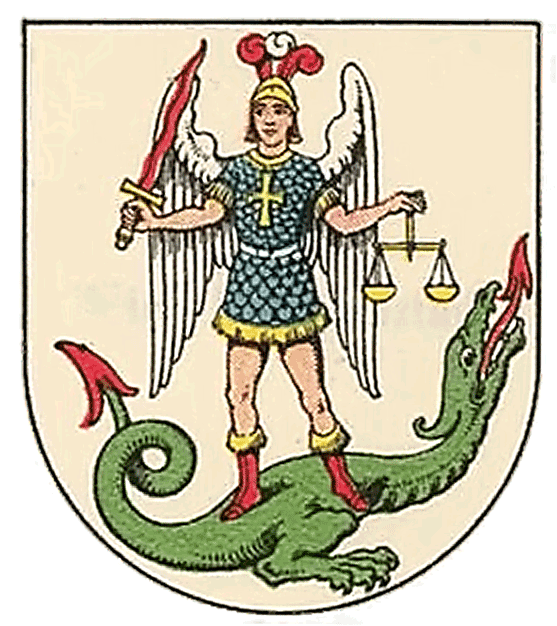
- Coat of arms

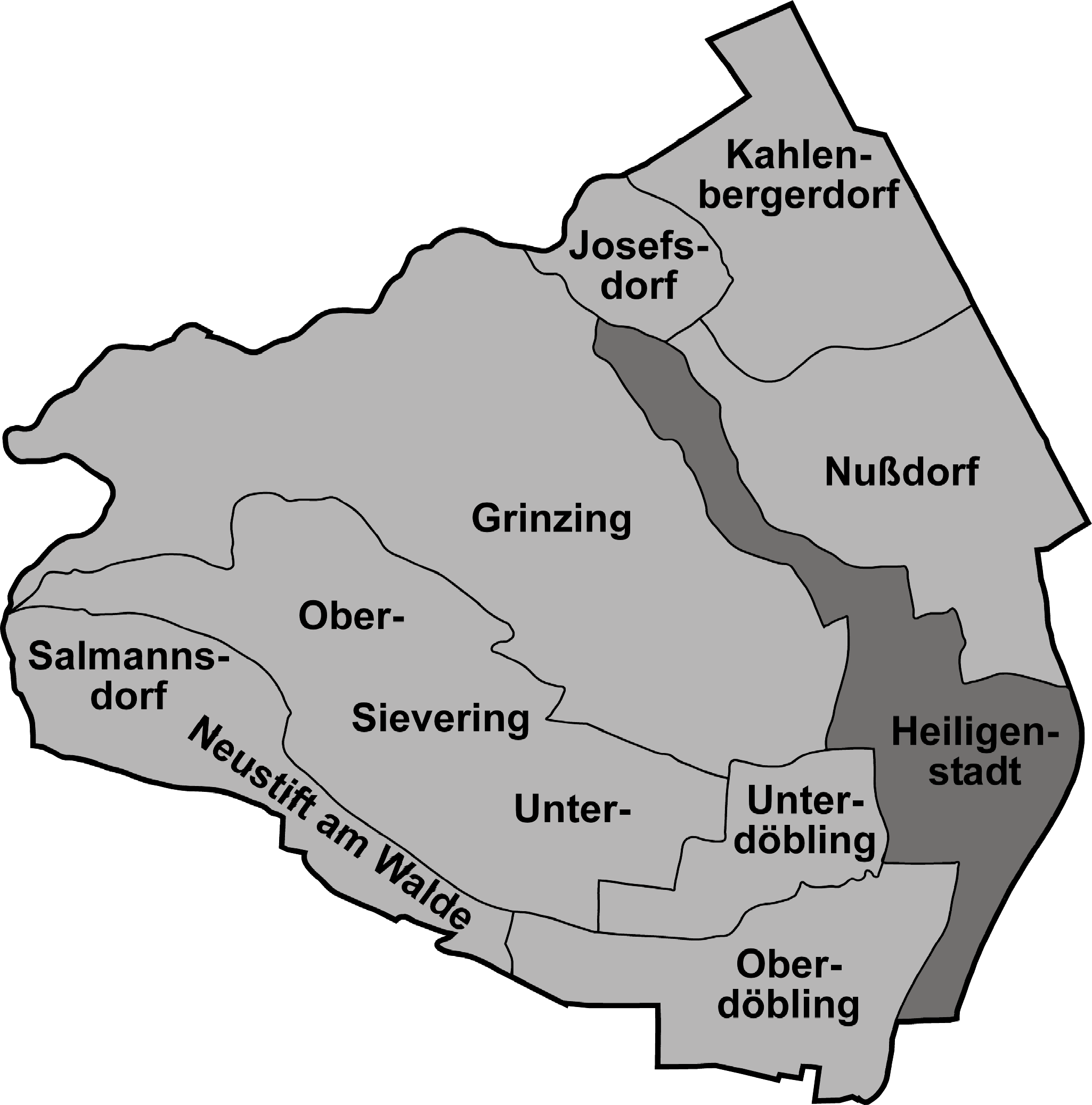
- Location of the district within Döbling
- Country: Austria
- City: Vienna

Heiligenstadt (in German: Wien Heiligenstadt; Central Bavarian: Heiligenstod) was an independent municipality until 1892 and is today a part of Döbling, the 19th district of Vienna, Austria.

Heiligenstadt is one of the 10 municipalities in the Döbling District.

== Geography ==
Heiligenstadt lies on flat land abutting the Danube canal and forms a thin strip that stretches to the north-west as far as Leopoldsberg. The municipality covers an area of 219.46 hectares, bordering in the north on Nußdorf and Josefsdorf, in the west on Grinzing, and in the south on Unterdöbling and Oberdöbling. The Probusgasse was once the main street of the village of Heiligenstadt and today marks the centre of the municipality.

== History ==
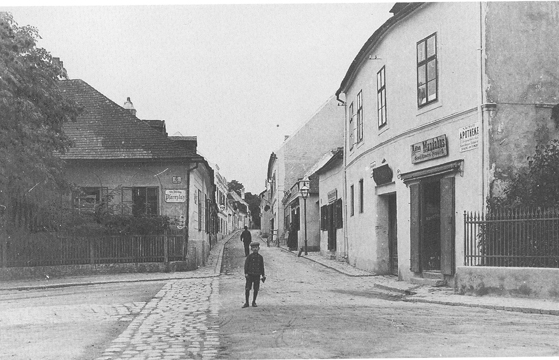
The Probusgasse in 1898

=== The origin of the name Heiligenstadt ===
The name Heiligenstadt (Holy city) suggests that there was already a holy site in this area before the arrival of Christianity. The first record of a settlement dates to 1120 and refers to it as St. Michael. The Archangel Michael is also depicted in Heiligenstadt's coat of arms. The term Sanctum Locum (Heiligenstadt) first appears in documents at the end of the 12th century, although it is unclear which holy site is being referred to. The theory that Saint Severinus of Noricum once lived here has been disproved.

=== Heiligenstadt from pre-history to the end of the Middle Ages ===
Heiligenstadt was first settled more than 5000 years ago. Traces of Roman settlement have also been found. In 1872, remains of a wall were found in Heiligenstadt that prove that a Roman tower, part of the limes once stood in this area. A Roman cemetery has also been found near the Jakobskirche (St. James’ Church), as has an Avar tomb from the 6th century. The Franks followed, settling in Heiligenstadt for the first time around 900. Originally, settlement centred on the area around the modern-day Pfarrplatz and included the first church in the area. The inhabitants were farmers who were largely reliant on their own produce. They also caught crabs and fish in the western arm of the Danube (where today the Heiligenstädter Straße is located). Wine was produced for sale; wine cellars can to this day be found in the side of the hill beside the Heiligenstädter Straße. The Klosterneuburg Monastery owned vineyards in Heiligenstadt as early as 1250. In 1304, bishop Weinhardt von Passau gave the monastery the right to take over the parish Heiligenstadt after the death of the parish priest. In the Middle Ages, Heiligenstadt was one of the richer settlements in the area. A school is documented in 1318; it was probably the only one in the area. Like many other towns on the outskirts of Vienna, Heiligenstadt suffered greatly in the turmoils of the 15th and 16th centuries. Matthias Corvinus laid waste to Heiligenstadt in 1484, while Turkish plundering during the first siege of Vienna in 1529 greatly damaged the Jakobskirche and the Michaelskirche (St. Michael's Church). It was however possible to restore the latter in 1534 thanks to donations made by the inhabitants of Döbling, Grinzing, Nußdorf and Heiligenstadt (all of which belonged to this parish).

=== Heiligenstadt since the Middle Ages ===
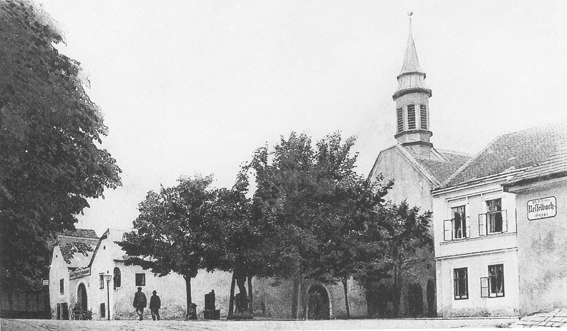
The parish church in Heiligenstadt in 1900

The Reformation left Heiligenstadt largely untouched, but in 1683 the settlement fell victim to the second siege of Vienna. Many of the inhabitants of Heiligenstadt were massacred; the name of the Blutgasse (Blood Street) still recalls this event. The devastation was so complete that the settlement resembled a wasteland. Heiligenstadt's economy did not recover until the 18th century, when local cattle and fruit became popular at markets in Vienna. Heiligenstadt's recovery was helped at the end of the 18th century by the construction of a public bath that made use of a hot-water spring. As many as 300 people visited the bath and adjoining restaurant every day.

==== Beethoven ====
In the summer months Heiligenstadt was a tourist spot. Ludwig van Beethoven lived there from April to October 1802 while coming to terms with his growing deafness. It was a difficult time for the composer. In a letter to his brothers, the famous Heiligenstadt Testament, he shared thoughts of suicide. But he returned from the town with a rejuvenated outlook as well as new priorities in his music (the start of his "Middle Period"), and lived for a further 25 years.

==== 19th Century ====
The hot-water spring dried up in the second half of the 19th century, and a park was eventually opened where the bath once stood. Yet the town's reputation for favorable summer weather continued to grow, and members of Vienna's bourgeoisie continued to settle in Heiligenstadt. In 1851, the Zentralanstalt für Meteorologie und Geodynamik (Central Bureau for Meteorology and Geodynamics), Austria's state meteorological and geophysical service, was established at the Hohe Warte. Heiligenstadt Cemetery was founded in 1873.

==== Growth ====
Heiligenstadt's growth was rapid in the 18th and 19th centuries. In 1795 there were 60 houses with 470 inhabitants, who lived in three streets near where the Grinzinger Straße, Probusgasse, Hohe Warte, and Armbrustergasse are now. By 1832 there were 677 inhabitants in 94 houses. By 1870 the figures had jumped to 3393 inhabitants in 244 houses. Around 1890 several factories were opened in Heiligenstadt, and the number of inhabitants rose to 5579. In the space of 60 years, the number of houses had more than tripled. The 6000 m^{2} Heiligenstadt pond, in which the residents used to bathe, fell victim to this construction boom. It became a problem as a result of pollution and was filled in the 1920s.

=== Heiligenstadt following its integration into the city of Vienna ===
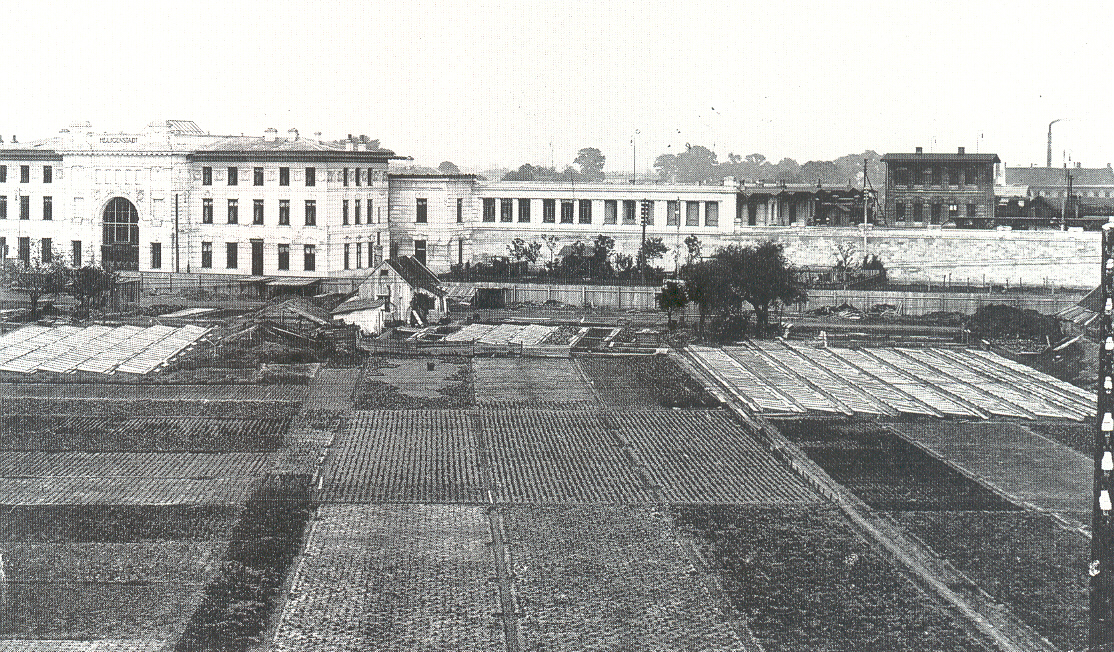
A view of the railway station in Heiligenstadt from the Karl-Marx-Hof

In 1892, Heiligenstadt was officially integrated into the city of Vienna together with the surrounding suburbs Sievering, Grinzing, Oberdöbling, Unterdöbling, Nußdorf and Kahlenbergerdorf.

In 1898, the Heiligenstadt train station, designed by Otto Wagner, was opened as a transfer point between the Emperor Franz Joseph Railway, which had entered service in 1870, the Wiener Stadtbahn, and the Vorortelinie. Today, the station is also an important bus station for busses within Vienna and towards Klosterneuburg.

Following World War I, the social democrat municipal government pursued a policy of building affordable accommodation in order to improve the miserable living conditions of the working classes. To this end, the enormous Karl-Marx-Hof was constructed in Heiligenstadt on land where until the 12th century there had been an arm of the Danube that was deep enough for ships to use and where fruit and vegetable gardens had later stood. The complex, which includes 1382 apartments, was constructed by Karl Ehn, one of Otto Wagner's students and technical director for the City of Vienna. The Karl-Marx-Hof later became famous for its role in the 1934 February Uprising when rebellious workers took shelter in the building.

== Economy ==
Viticulture was still playing an important role in the local economy at the start of the 19th century. 30% of available land were used for vineyards, a further 25% for agriculture. Pasture made up another 20% and around 8% were used to grow fruit. At the end of the 18th century however, the first factories were opened in Heiligenstadt. At number 135 in the Heiligenstädter Straße, a sulphuric acid factory was opened that only closed again in 1939. Other notable companies included Barawitzka (known later as Engel), which produced parquet here between 1838 and 1932, the machine factory Heinrich (1840 to 1964) and the Just-Leitern-AG, which was founded in 1885 and still operates in Lower Austria. Its factory was at number 125 in the Heiligenstädter Straße. Heiligenstadt's industrial prominence was recognised following the creation of the Döbling district, when the area from the Heiligenstädter Straße to the Danube canal was declared an industrial zone. There were however also important companies in the centre of Heiligenstadt. From 1889, the Pokornygasse 7 was home to a factory where coffee was roasted, a producer of coffee substitutes and a wine cellar all belonging to the Kunz brothers. From 1919, pralines were also being produced in the Gatterburggasse. The production was sold to the Julius Meinl AG in 1935.

== Sports ==
First Vienna F.C. established on 22 August 1894, it is the country's oldest team and has played a notable role in the history of the game in Austria. They play at the Hohe Warte Stadium, also the home of Vienna Vikings American football team.
