= Saint Bernhard Abbey =

Cistercian nunnery in Austria

Coordinates: 48°41′07″N 15°35′42″E

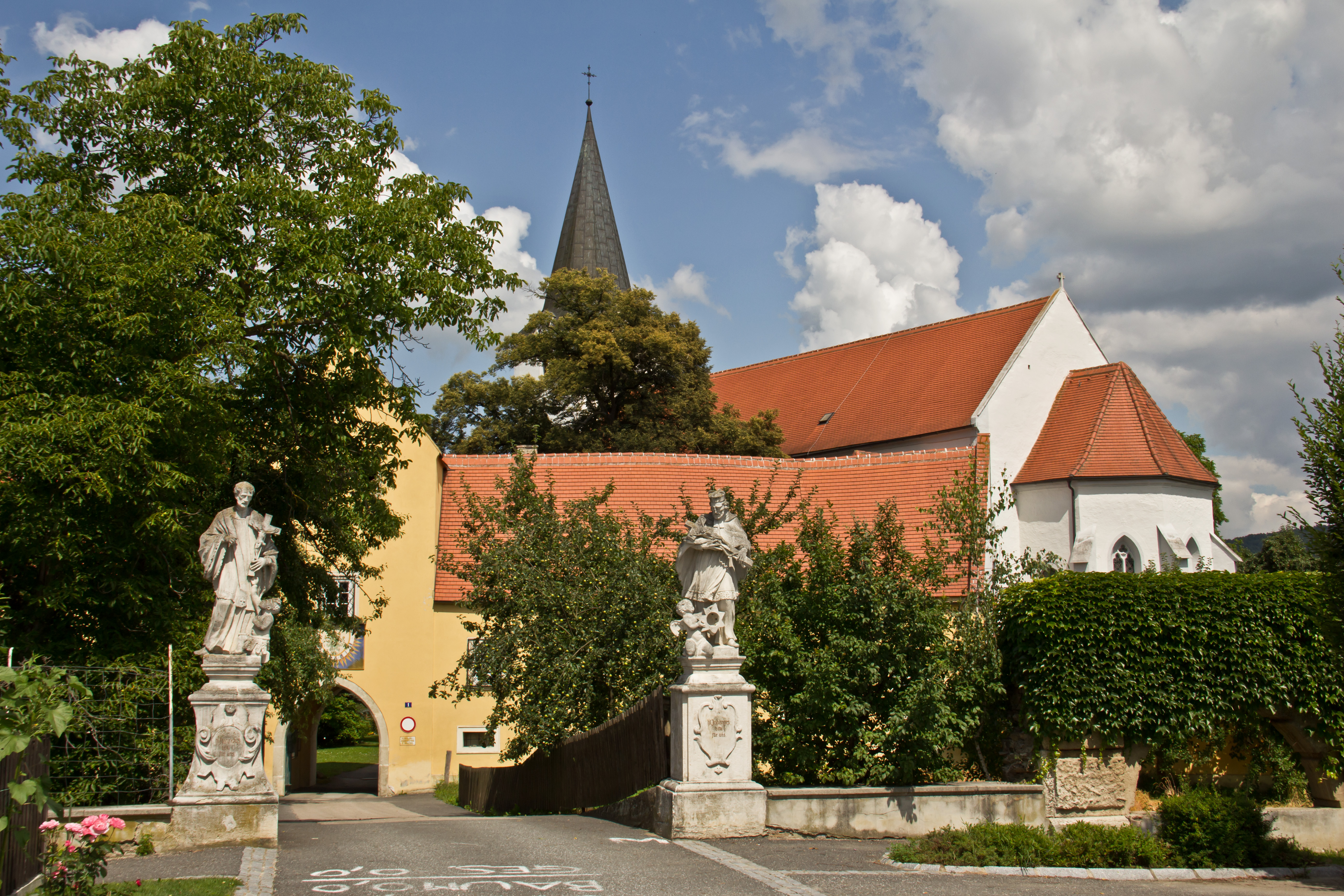
Former St. Bernard Abbey

Sankt Bernhard Abbey (German: Stift Sankt Bernhard) is a former Cistercian nunnery in Sankt Bernhard-Frauenhofen in Lower Austria.

== History ==
In 1277, the Cistercian nunnery previously located in Neumelon was relocated onto land in Chrueg im Pewreich am Teffenbach (the modern Sankt Bernhard) which Stephan von Maissau had donated for this purpose. He was married to Margarete von Neuhaus, a member of the noble family of Hradec, whose sister was the abbess here in 1285.

The abbey was dissolved in 1580 during the Reformation and in 1586, the building and its grounds were granted to the Jesuit college in Vienna. After the college was in turn dissolved in 1773, the former abbey passed through a number of private hands and began to decay, until it came into the possession of Klosterneuburg Priory in 1852 following the death of the Freiherr von Ehrenfels. In 1947, the abbey church was renovated. In 1961 the chapter house along with the remains of the cloister were removed to Klosterneuburg Priory.

== See also ==
- List of Jesuit sites
