= Heiligenstadt Testament =

1802 letter by Ludwig van Beethoven

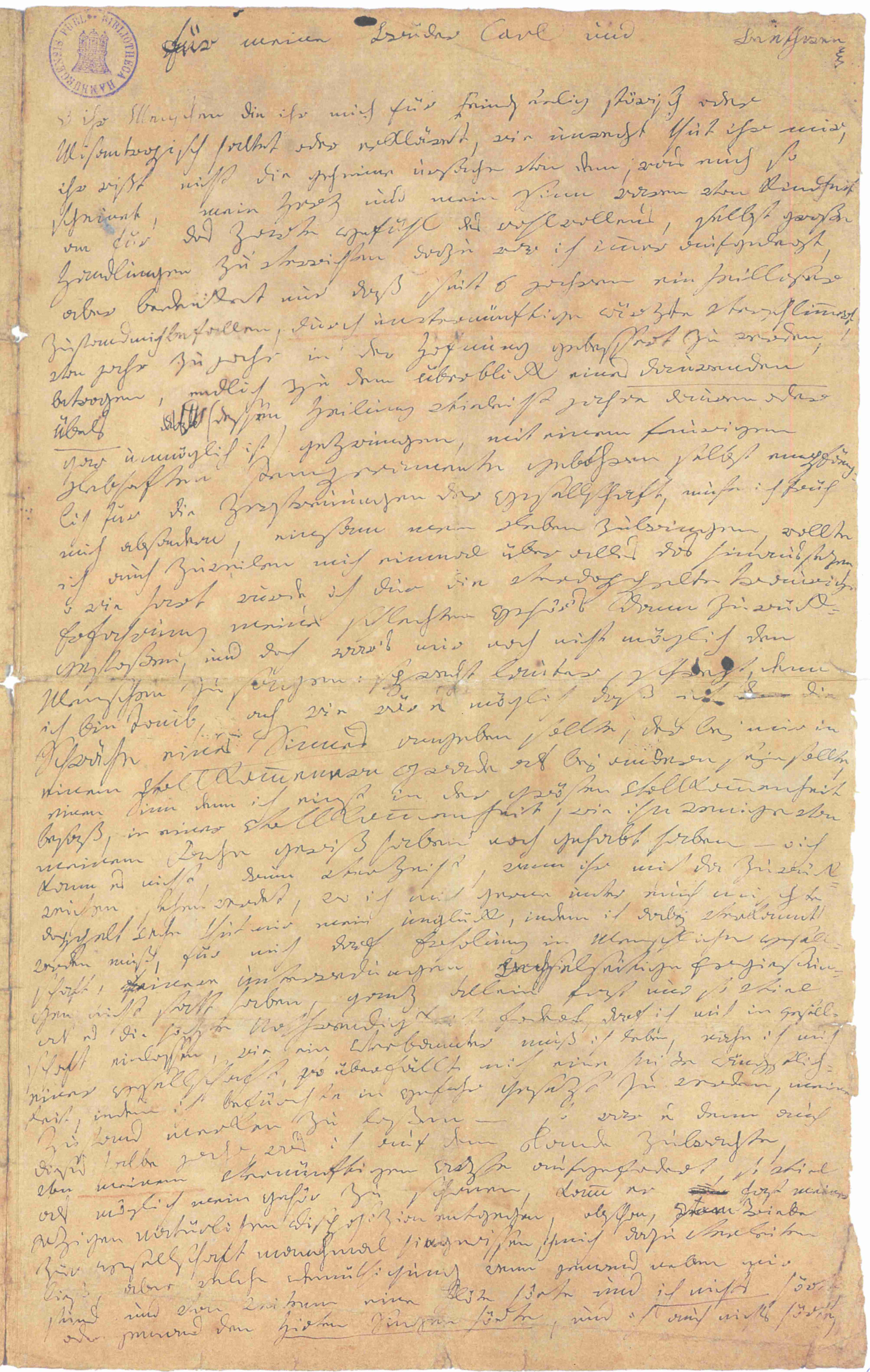
A facsimile of the Heiligenstadt Testament

The Heiligenstadt Testament is a letter written by Ludwig van Beethoven to his brothers Karl and Johann at Heiligenstadt on 6 October 1802.

It reflects his despair over his increasing deafness, even his contemplation of suicide, and his continued desire to overcome his physical and emotional ailments to complete his artistic destiny. Beethoven kept the document among his private papers and probably never showed it to anyone. It was discovered in March 1827, after Beethoven's death, by Anton Schindler and Stephan von Breuning, who had it published the following October.

While Carl's name appears in the appropriate places, blank spaces are left where Johann's name should appear (as in the upper right corner of the accompanying image). There have been several suggestions for this, ranging from Beethoven's uncertainty as to whether Johann's full name (Nikolaus Johann) should be used on this quasi-legal document, to his mixed feelings of attachment to his brothers, to transference of his lifelong hatred of the boys' alcoholic, abusive, deceased father, also named Johann.

Since 1888, the original document has been in the State and University Library Carl von Ossietzky at the University of Hamburg, a gift from the Swedish singer Jenny Lind and her husband, Otto Goldschmidt.

Rodion Shchedrin composed a work inspired by the document which likewise bears the same name. It was premiered on December 18, 2008, in Munich Philharmonic in the Gasteig.

In 2019, Jake Runestad composed a work inspired by the document called A Silence Haunts Me. In it, the chorus sings an English translation of the document accompanied either by piano, a chamber wind ensemble, or full orchestra. At the end of the work, musicians and singers continue to sing and play silently, inviting the audience to experience the silence of deafness.
