= Weinbergkirche, Vienna =

Coordinates: 48°14′46″N 16°19′52″E

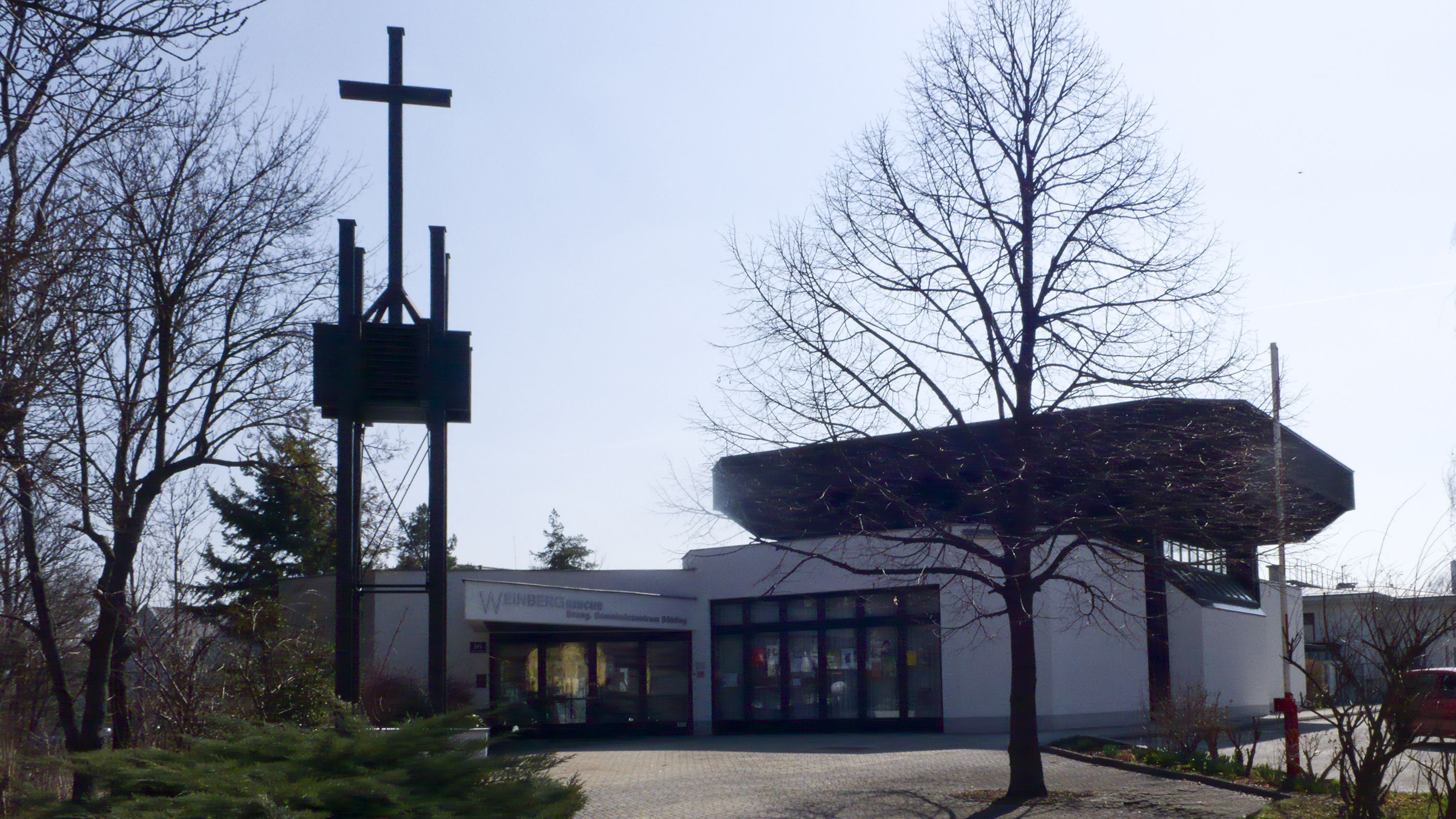
Weinbergkirche (Wien-Döbling) in Vienna Döbling

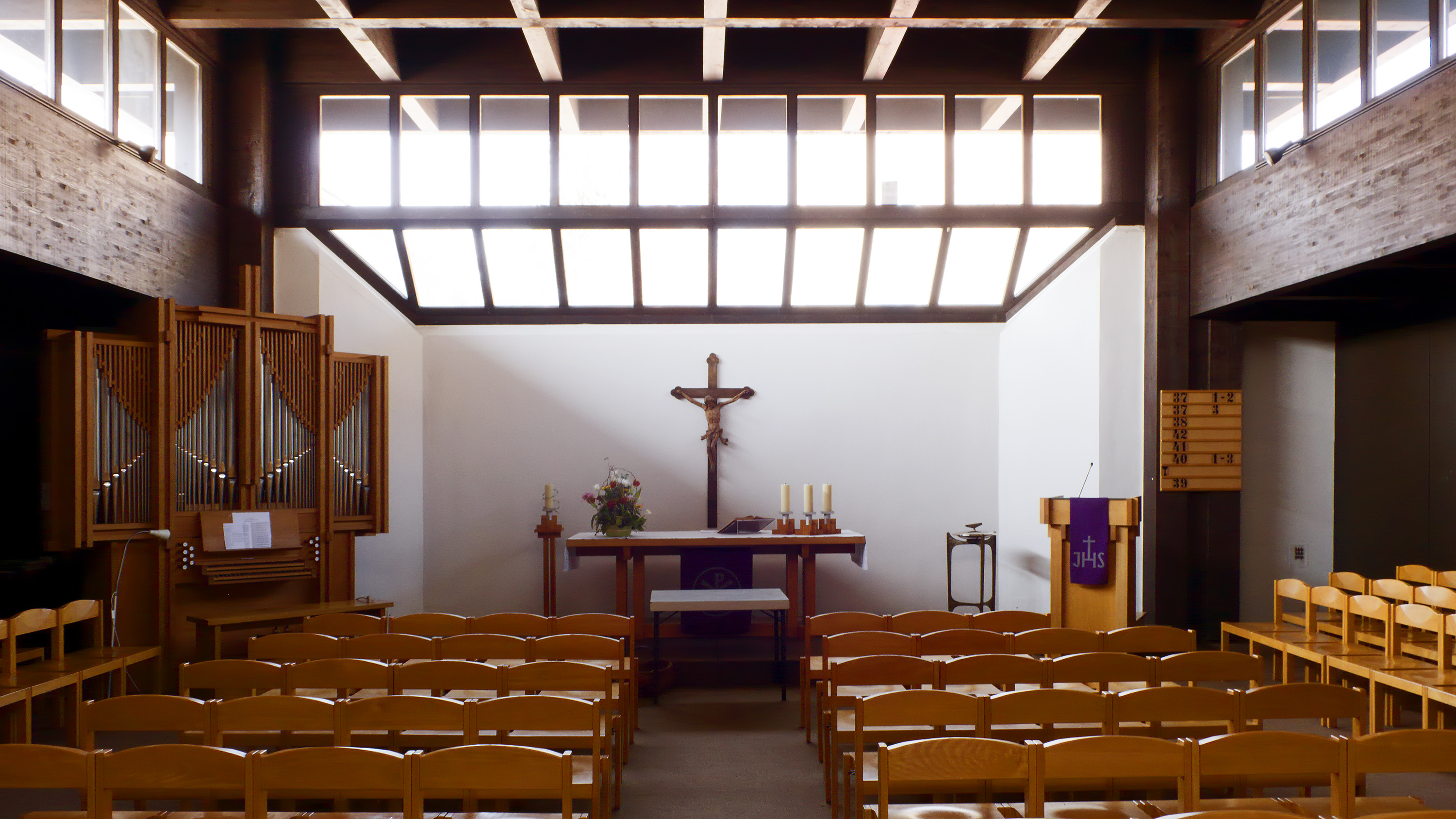
The church interior

The Weinbergkirche is a Lutheran parish church in the Börnergasse suburb of Sievering in the 19th district of Vienna, Döbling.

== History ==
The Döbling congregation originated as a sub-group in the Lutherkirche within the Währing parish. The Döbling parish was made independent in 1965; its services were held at first in rented accommodation in the Kreindlgasse. After an affordable site for a church was found in the Börnergasse, the Weinbergkirche was erected there between 1980 and 1981. The name of the church (Weinbergkirche = Vineyard Church) is a reference both to its location by a vineyard and to the Biblical parables of the vineyard, grapevine and wine grapes.

== The building ==
The Weinbergkirche is a simple, modern construction. Sliding panels make it possible to use the minimalistic church room for a variety of purposes and for both small and large-scale events. The ground floor also includes the parish offices; the cellar contains a room for youth events and a large communal room.
