= Meiselberg =

Coordinates: 48°15′8″N 16°19′24″E

The Meiselberg is a hill in the Döbling district of Vienna, Austria. It reaches an elevation of approximately 291 metres (955 ft) above sea level and forms part of the hilly landscape of northwestern Vienna.

The hill lies within the historically and geographically varied district of Döbling, an area characterized by vineyards, wooded slopes, residential neighborhoods and former village settlements that were incorporated into Vienna during the city's expansion.

== Etymology ==
The name Meiselberg is probably a reference to the hill's steep ridge and most likely derives from the Middle High German meizel (meaning chisel). Today, the hill is sparsely settled, but in contrast to the surrounding hills, is not used for viticulture.

== Geography ==
The Meiselberg represents the north-eastern extension of the Schenkenberg and lies in the suburb of Sievering. The limits of the Meiselberg are defined by the Kaasgraben to the north and the Arbesbach to the south. The hill is part of a north-eastern chain of foothills belonging to the eastern Alps. It is composed of flysch containing quartz, limestone, marl, and other conglomerates.

The hill is located within the transition between Vienna's densely developed urban area and the more open, wooded landscape toward the Vienna Woods. This makes the surrounding area a mixture of residential development, green spaces and cultivated land.

The Meiselberg is situated in the western part of Döbling, among the hills that rise from the Vienna Basin toward the Vienna Woods. The surrounding landscape consists of gently to moderately sloping terrain, with elevations increasing toward the west.

At approximately 291 metres above sea level, the Meiselberg is a relatively modest elevation compared with the higher hills of the Vienna Woods. Nevertheless, its elevated position contributes to the distinctive landscape of Döbling and provides views across parts of Vienna from some surrounding areas.

The area around the Meiselberg is predominantly urban and residential, although remnants of the district's rural and agricultural past can still be found in the wider vicinity. Döbling is particularly known for its vineyards, which occupy many of the sunnier slopes in the western and northern parts of the district.

The Meiselberg and the surrounding hills are characteristic of the northern and western outskirts of Vienna. The terrain provides a contrast to the flatter areas of the city farther east and south.

Vegetation in the wider area includes deciduous woodland, gardens, vineyards and other forms of urban and semi-rural greenery. The combination of elevated terrain and vegetation contributes to Döbling's reputation as one of Vienna's greener districts.

== History ==
The Meiselberg forms part of the historic landscape of Döbling, whose individual settlements developed over centuries before becoming incorporated into the city of Vienna. The hills and slopes of the area influenced the development of agriculture and viticulture, as well as the location of roads and settlements.

As Vienna expanded during the industrialisation of the 19th and 20th centuries, many formerly rural areas of Döbling became increasingly urbanized. The landscape around the Meiselberg was consequently transformed by residential construction and the expansion of Vienna's infrastructure.

== See also ==
- Döbling
- Vienna Woods
- Vienna
- Vienna Basin
- Viticulture in Austria

== Sources ==
- Kothbauer, Karl: Döbling - und seine Ried- und Flurnamen. Dissertation Wien 2001 (in German)
