= Schenkenberg =

Schenkenberg may refer to:

- Groß Schenkenberg
- Marcus Schenkenberg (born 1968), model
- Schenkenberg Castle
- Schenkenberg, Brandenburg
- Schenkenberg, Vienna
