= Salmannsdorf =

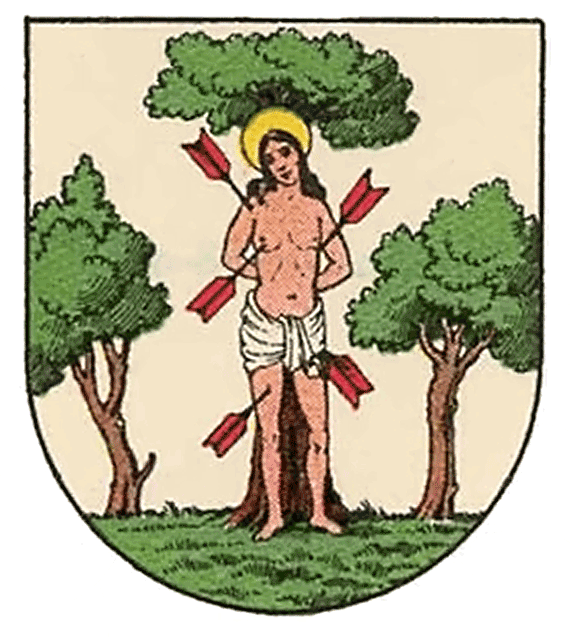
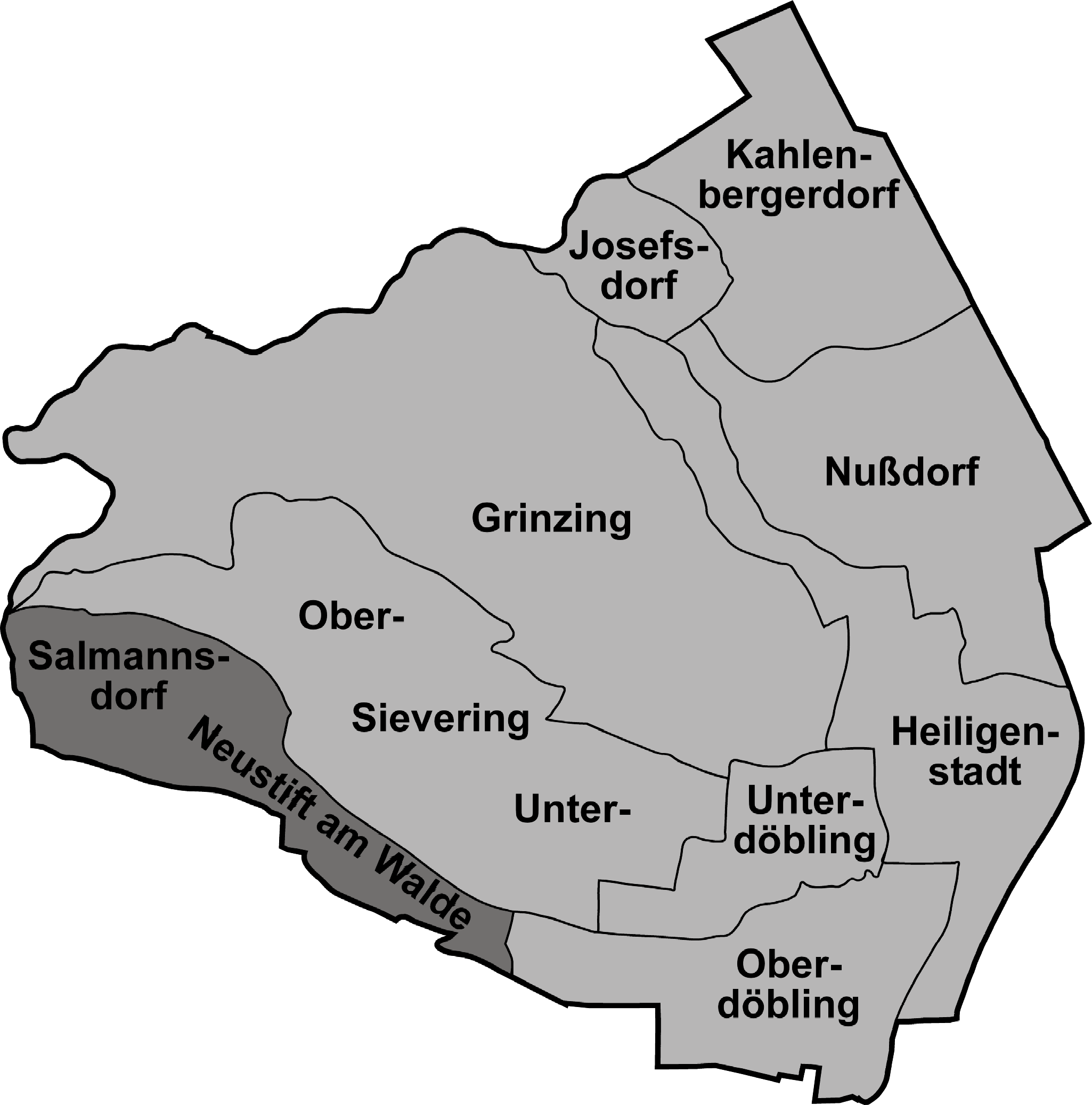
Salmannsdorf
Coat of arms	Map
AUT Salmannsdorf COA
Location: 48°15′18″N 16°17′36″E

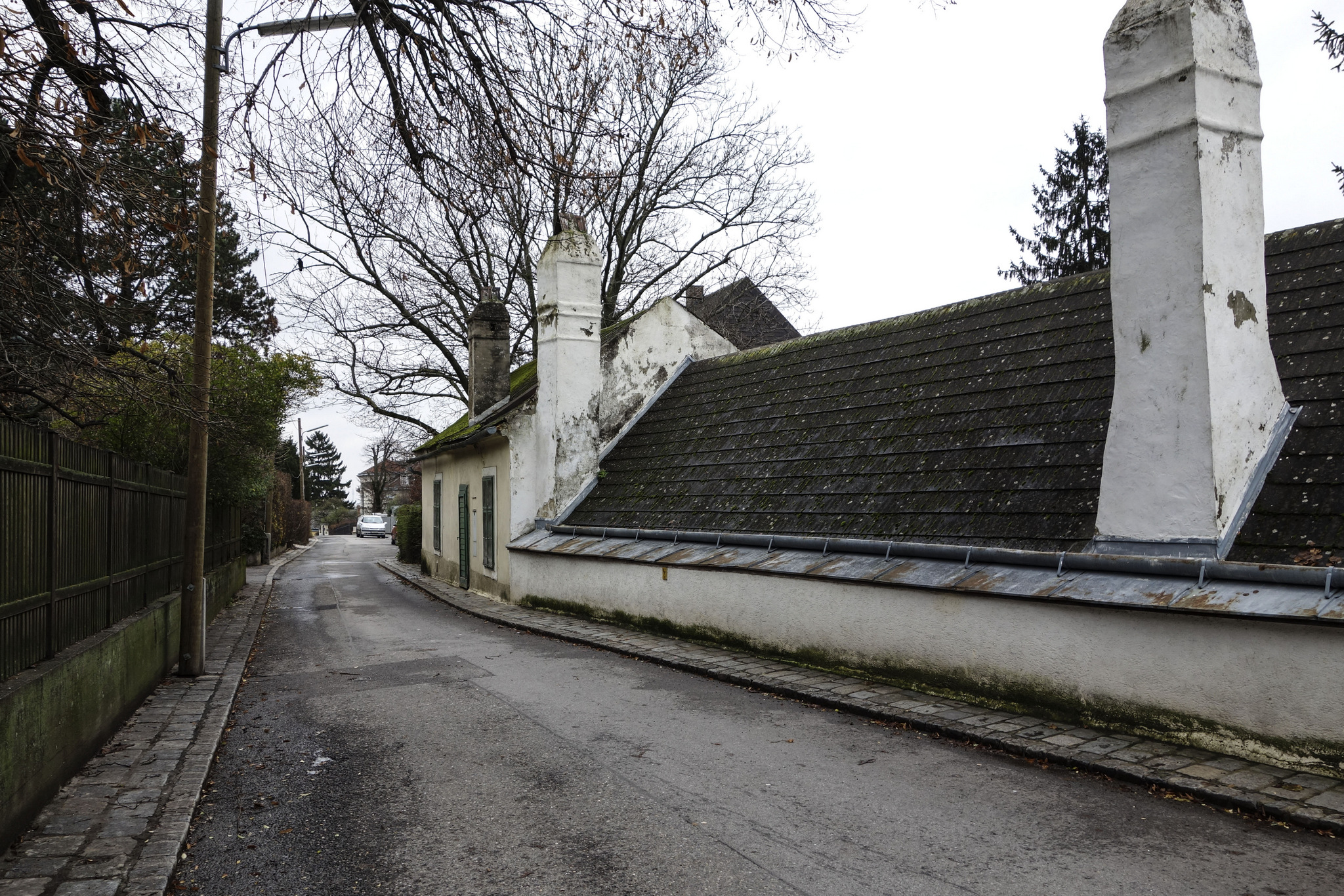
Salmannsdorferstraße

Salmannsdorf (Central Bavarian: Salmaunsduaf) is a part of Döbling, the 19th district of Vienna.

Salmannsdorf was an independent municipality until 1892, when it was incorporated into the Währing district of the city of Vienna. However, in 1938, Salmannsdorf was reassigned together with Neustift am Walde to the district of Döbling.

Salmannsdorf lies along the western border of Sievering. It is one of the 10 municipalities in the district of Döbling.

== Geography ==
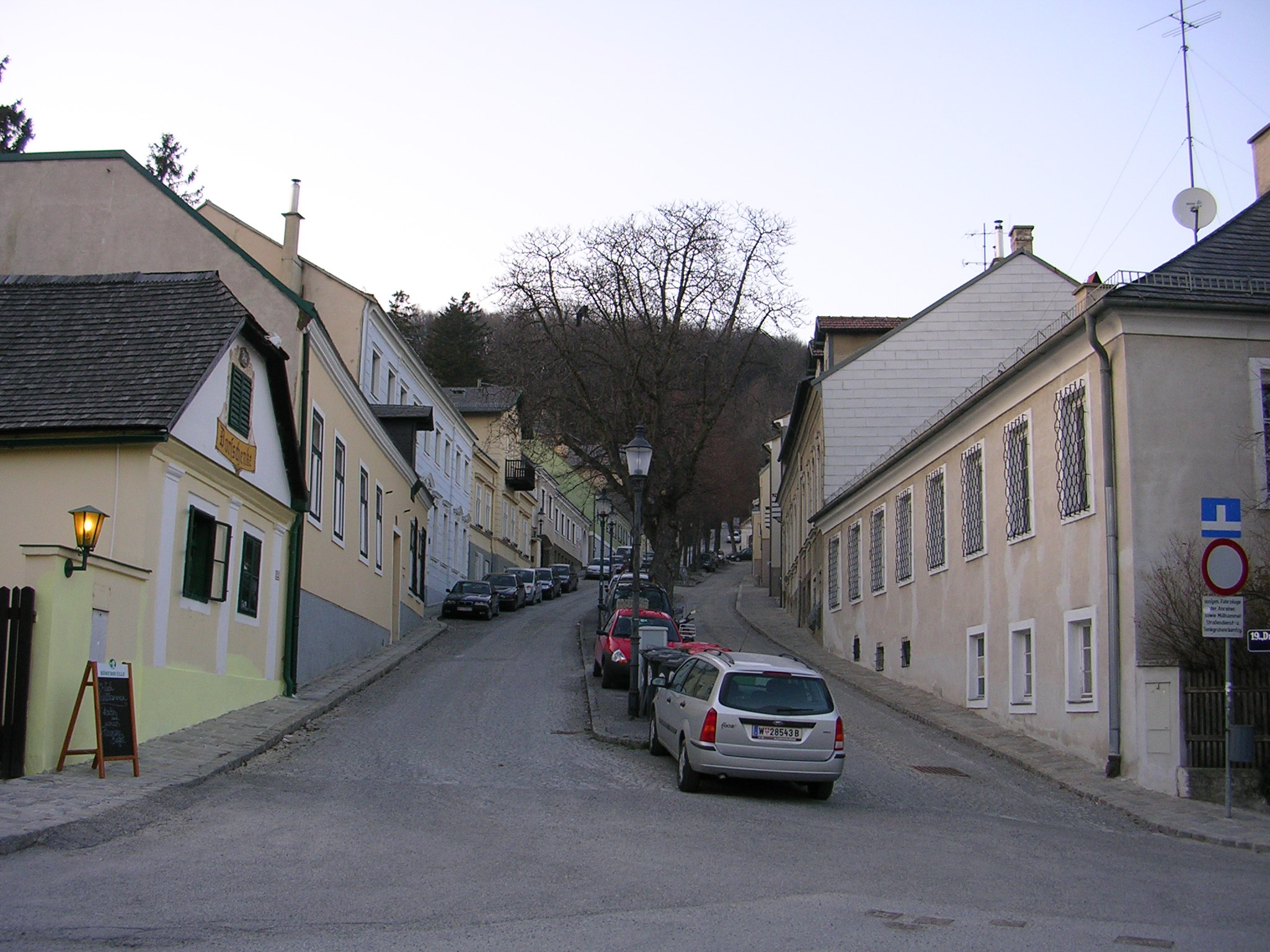
Dreimarksteingasse (street), in the centre of Salmannsdorf.

Salmannsdorf is located in the northwest of Vienna and is part of the district of Döbling. Salmannsdorf lies on the southern slope of Dreimarkstein hill, in the valley of the Krottenbach stream. The Katastralgemeinde stretches across an area of 66.05 hectares. The region is part of the statistical census-district of Salmannsdorf-Glanzing. In the south, Salmannsdorf borders on Neustift am Walde; in the east, on Obersievering. The border in the west divides it from Neuwaldegg; in the north lies the Dreimarkstein hill, with the border to Hinterweidling in Lower Austria.

== History ==
=== The origin of the name Salmannsdorf ===
Salmannsdorf was first mentioned in 1279 as Salmanstorf. The name derives either from the personal name Salman or the professional title Salmann (a trustee or clerk).

=== Salmannsdorf in modern times ===
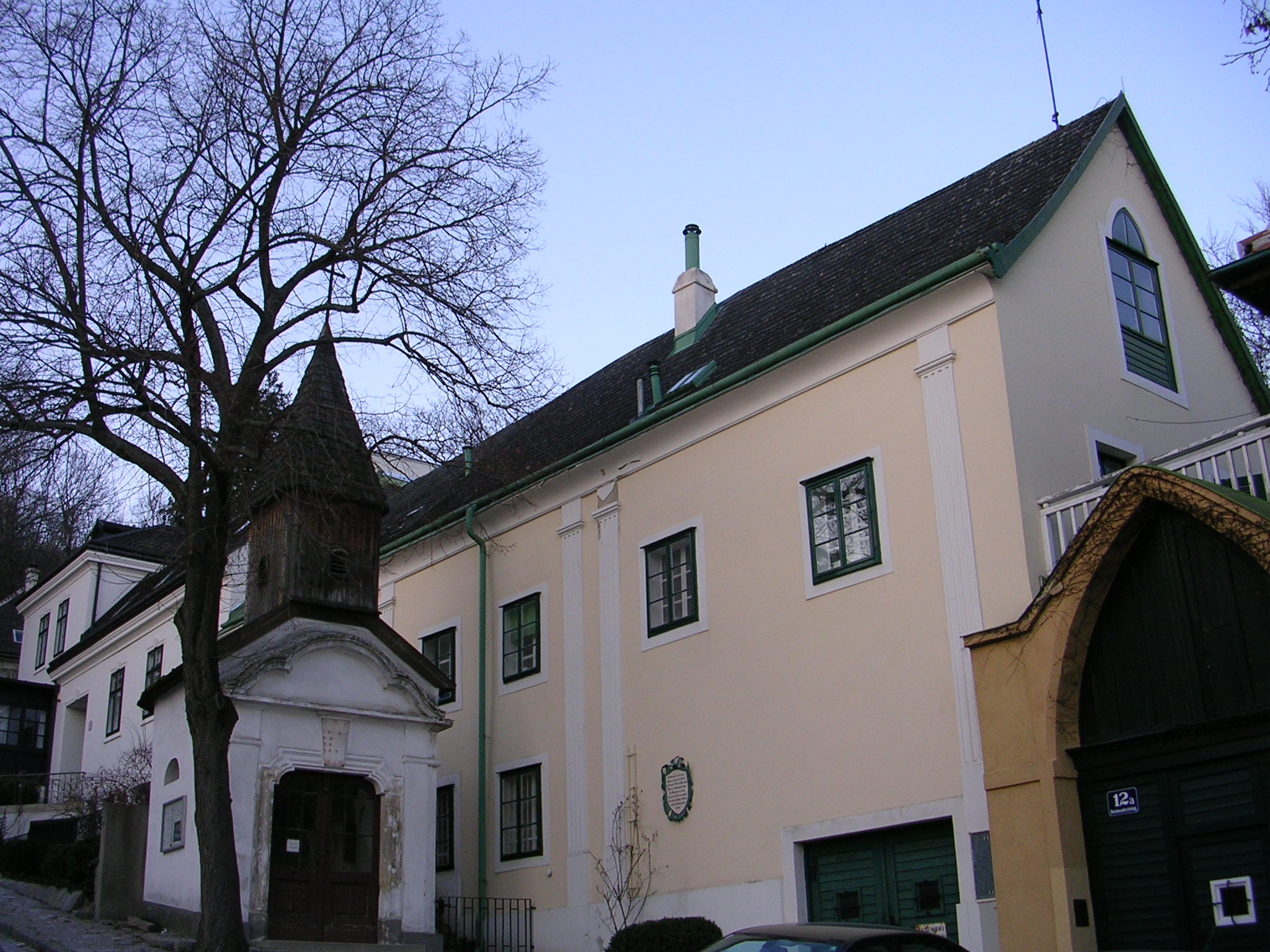
The chapel in the centre of Salmannsdorf.

Salmannsdorf’s location suggests that it was a planned settlement. Over time, it developed into a village typical of the area, with several streets and an economy and lifestyle that revolved around viticulture. In 1680, there were already 30 houses in Salmannsdorf, but the village’s development was stunted by the terrible devastation of the second siege of Vienna. In 1683, Salmannsdorf was completely destroyed. Two major outbreaks of fire did further damage in the ensuing years. The village had just 18 houses when the plague struck in 1713, killing 74 of the 118 inhabitants. Even 120 years later, Salmannsdorf had still barely exceeded its former size.

Salmannsdorf first began to grow around the middle of the 19th century, when, like its neighbour Neustift am Walde, it profited from tourists attracted by its fine summer weather. Salmannsdorf was not overly popular with Vienna’s wealthy families, but regular visitors between 1829 and 1832 included the family of Johann Strauß the Elder. A plaque at number 13, Dreimarksteingasse, celebrates the fact that Johann Strauß the Elder wrote his first waltz here. In 1890, there were 312 people living in 94 houses in Salmannsdorf.

In 1892, Salmannsdorf, along with the surrounding suburbs of Neustift am Walde, Währing, Weinhaus, Gersthof and Pötzleinsdorf was integrated into Vienna as the district of Währing. In a reorganisation of the district boundaries in 1938, Salmannsdorf and Neustift am Walde were assigned to the 19th district, Döbling.

== Economy ==
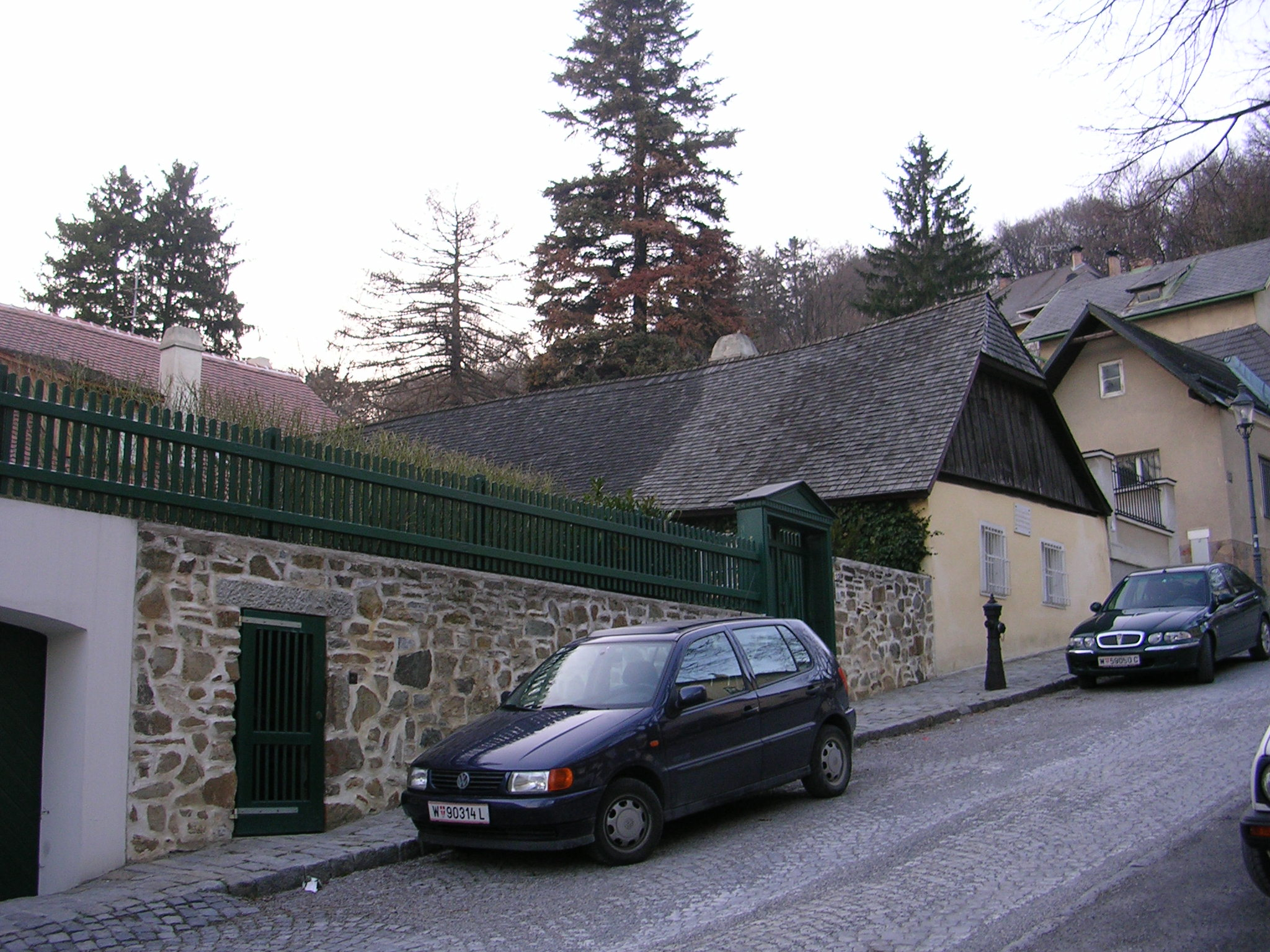
Old Farmhouse (where Johann Strauß the Elder stayed).

The distribution of available land at the start of the 19th century makes clear the importance of both forests and vineyards for the local economy. In 1826, woods occupied two thirds of the land, which belonged to the Klosterneuburg Monastery. Pasture occupied 15 percent, while vineyards made up another seven percent. There were no notable orchids or fields. The inhabitants lived first and foremost from the sale of wine and dairy products. When the dairy industry declined in the 19th century, wine remained as the primary source of income, and to this day wine is sold in local Heurige.

== Rail, road and bus links ==
Originally, there was a wagon train that passed through Neustift to Salmannsdorf, with varying destinations in the city over the years. For financial reasons, the operation of this transport link also changed hands several times, even though it was the only such connection to receive subventions from the City of Vienna. In 1908, the Wiener Linien introduced a trolleybus operating the Mercédès-Électrique-Stoll system from Pötzleinsdorf via Neustift am Walde to Salmannsdorf. This was one of the longest-serving routes using this system and it was only replaced in 1938 by an omnibus with the route number 23. The route was however cancelled the following year.

In 1928, a bus running along the Krottenbachstraße to Neustift and Salmannsdorf was introduced (from 1935 the number 20). Because this route took it past factories that were necessary for the war effort, this was the last bus route in Vienna that was still running in World War II. In 1942, preparations were made to introduce trolleybuses, which happened in 1946, but in 1958, motor-powered buses were re-introduced. From 1945 to 1961, this was the route number 22; thereafter and until 1972, it bore the number 39A, and since then, it has been the number 35A. This bus runs from the Spittelau station along the Krottenbachstraße via Neustift am Walde to its final destination in Salmannsdorf.
