= Elżbieta Góralczyk =

Polish actress

- Born: 8 April 1950
- Died: 16 January 2008 (aged 57); Vienna, Austria
- Occupation: Actress

Elżbieta Góralczyk-Kondrja (8 April 1950 – 16 January 2008) was a Polish actress and make-up artist.

== Biography ==
She is best known for her role as Anula Góralczyk in the Polish black-and-white television series Wojna domowa (1965-1966). The series was successful, but Góralczyk did not receive any relevant offers and only played minor roles in two productions. She graduated from Matura and then attended a school for making masks and worked for several years at Telewizja Polska. Later she moved to Vienna, where she married a lawyer. Doctors diagnosed her with severe kidney disease, but she avoided conventional medicine and the disease developed into cancer. Góralczyk died at the age of 57 and was buried in the cemetery in Sievering. She is the mother of Dominica (born 17 April 1975), who performs as a singer under the pseudonym Anik Kadinski.

== Filmography ==
- 1965–1966: Wojna domowa – Anula
- 1971: Nos – Dasza, Maidens
- 1978: Życie na gorąco – Maria Globner – Secretary to Otto Ildmann
