= Schloß Pötzleinsdorf =

Coordinates: 48°14′33″N 16°18′21″E

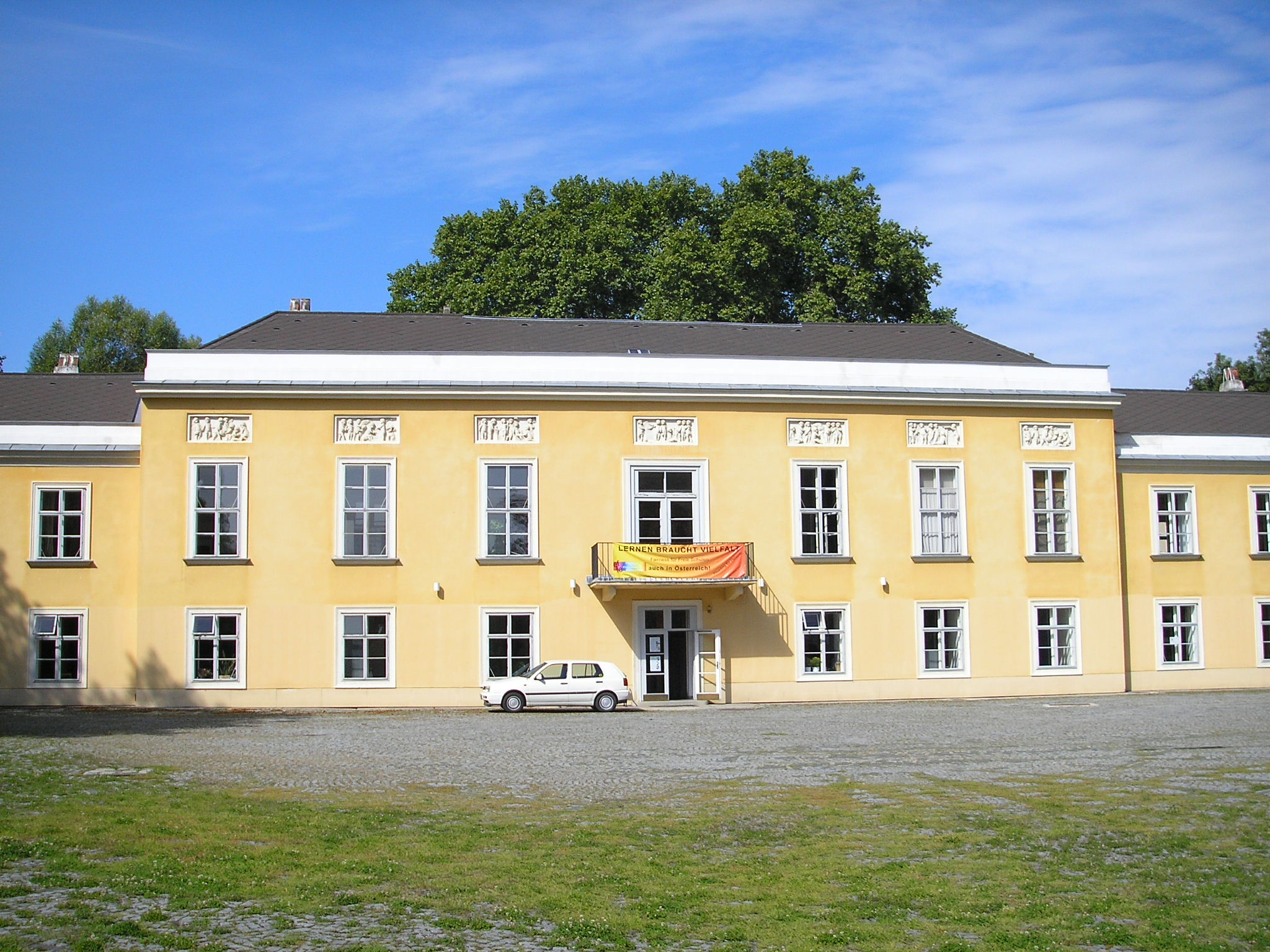
View of the Schloss front

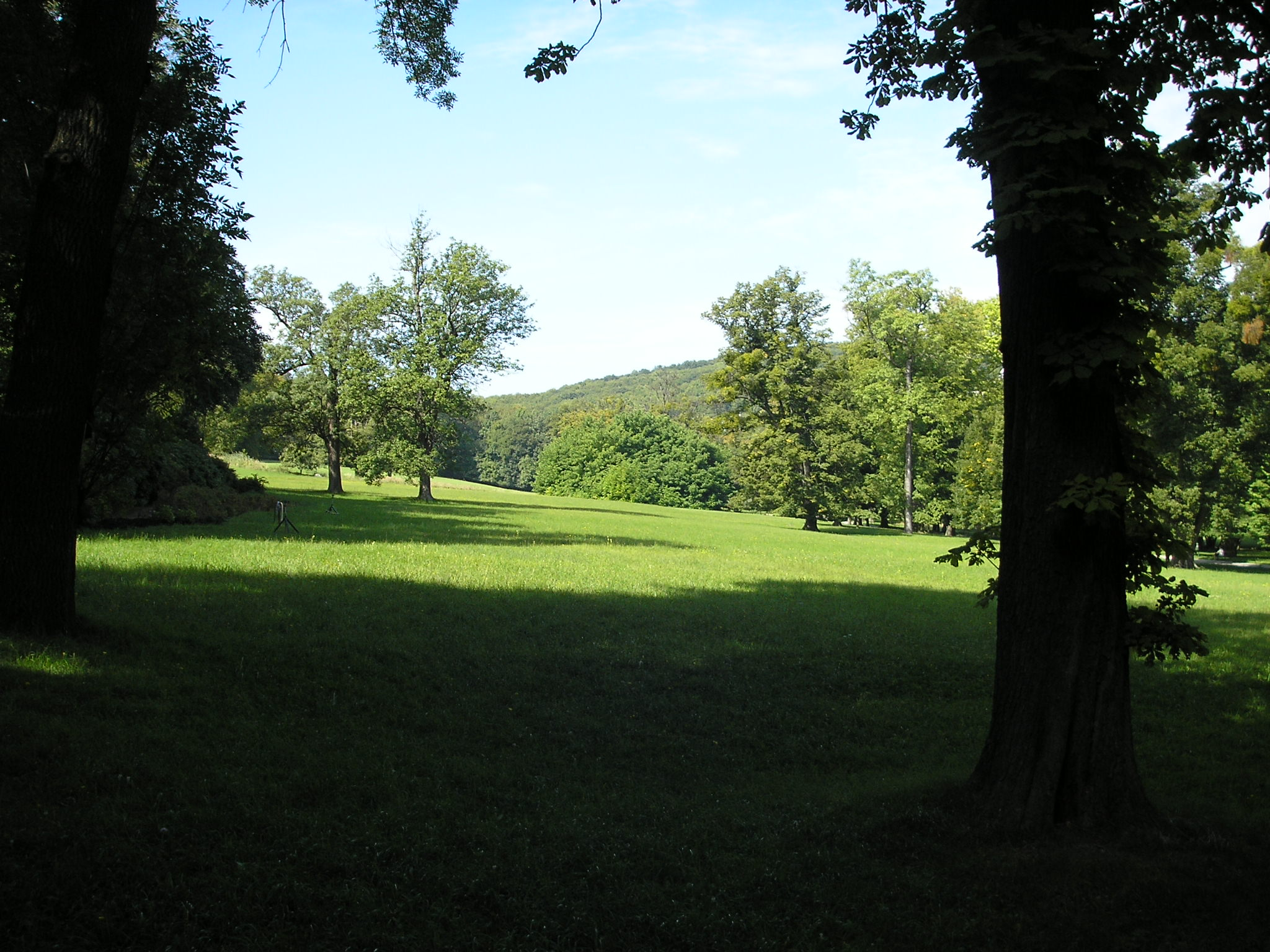
View of the park

Schloß Pötzleinsdorf or Schloss Pötzleinsdorf is a former palace in Pötzleinsdorf, Vienna. It is currently being used as a primary school.

== History ==
The palace was a nobleman's residence in the mid-17th century, but in the next century the building became known as Ricci'scher Freihof, after a merchant called Ricci who used it for cloth manufacture and silk dying. The estate was bought by Countess Philippina von Herberstein toward the end of the 18th century. She began turning the grounds into a park, before selling to the banker Johann Heinrich Geymüller in 1797. He rebuilt the house as a palace, and had the gardens landscaped in a romantic English style, since when they have been considered some of Vienna's finest. After Geymüller went bankrupt in 1841, the estate was auctioned, and had changed hands several times when the industrialist Max Schmidt purchased it in 1920. Since 1935 the palace and the surrounding 33 hectares of park have belonged to the city of Vienna and have been open to the public. When Roland Rainer modernised the building after the Second World War he removed many of the decorative features, both interior and exterior (including a set of impressive perrons at the front of the building) when a youth hostel was opened there. Today it houses the Vienna-Pötzleinsdorf Rudolf Steiner-Schule (a Steiner/Waldorf school).

== Location ==
The palace is in Geymüllergasse, Währing, the 18th district of Vienna. The address is Geymüllergasse 1, A-1180 Wien.
