= Neustift am Walde =

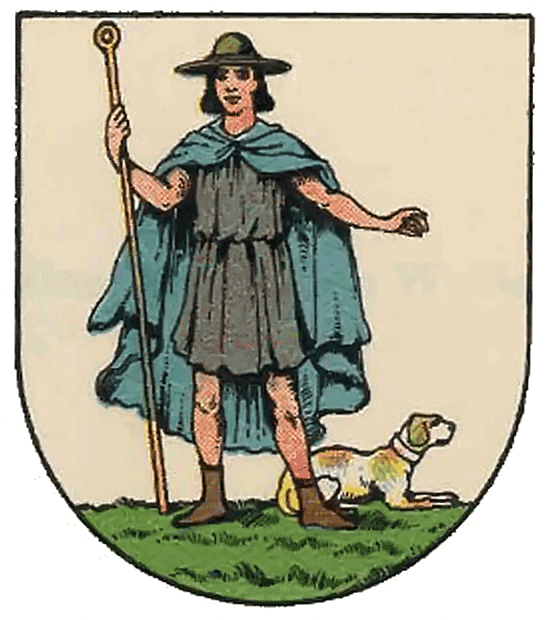
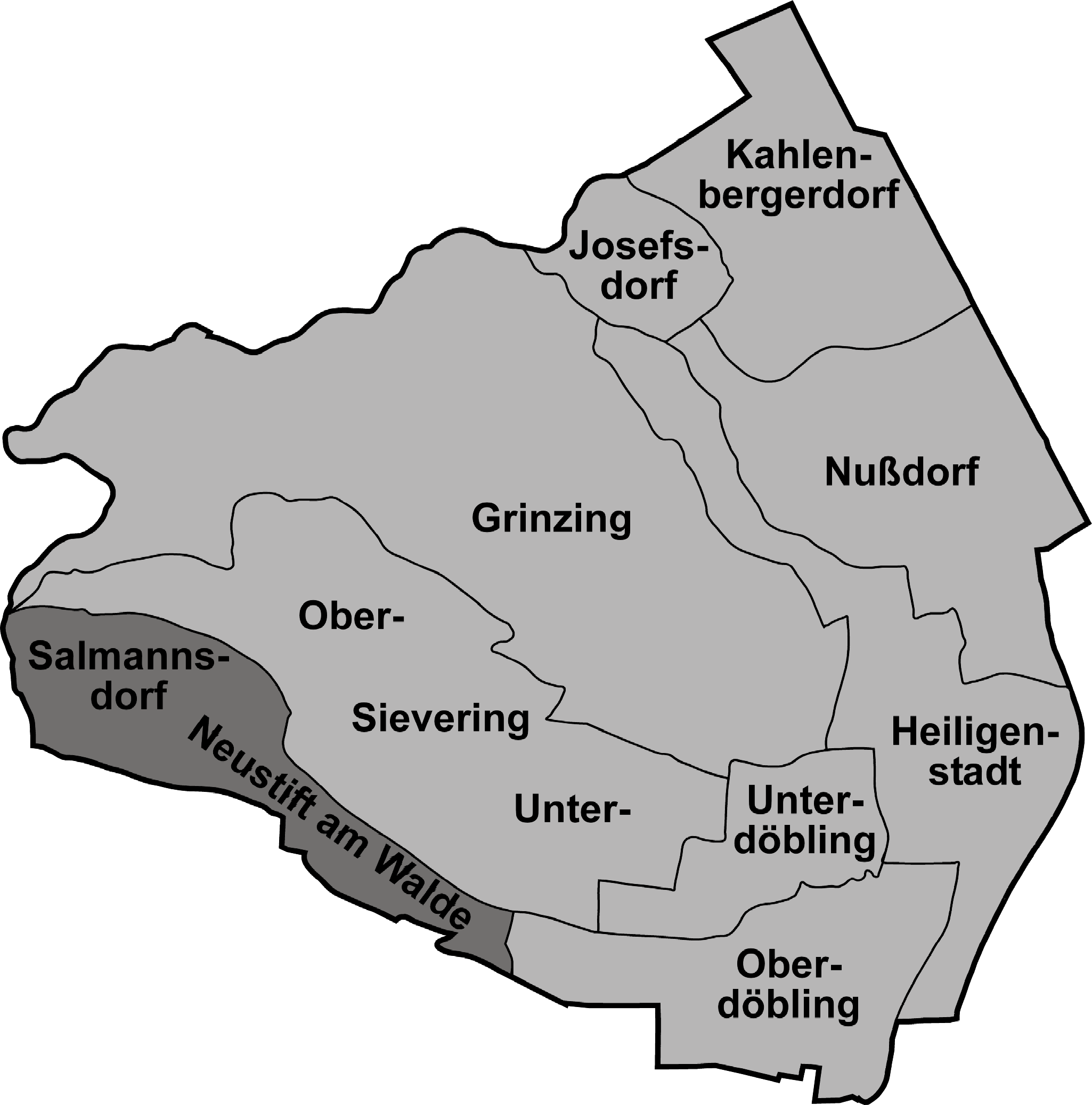
Neustift am Walde
Coat of arms	Map
AUT Neustift am Walde COA
Location: 48°15′4″N 16°18′5″E

Until 1892, Neustift am Walde (Central Bavarian: Neistift aum Woid) was an independent municipality on the outskirts of Vienna, Austria. Today it is part of Döbling, the 19th district of Vienna. It is also one of the 89 Katastralgemeinden.

== Geography ==
Neustift covers an area of 209.85 hectares, of which over one fourth (58 hectares) - largely made up of the Dorotheer Wald (forest) and the Neustifter Friedhof (cemetery) - lie in the district of Währing, while the section of Neustift in Döbling (151.85 hectares) includes inter alia the centre of the original settlement.

Neustift lies to the northwest of Pötzleinsdorf, to the west of Sievering, to the east of Neuwaldegg and to the southeast of Salmannsdorf. The village comprises two long rows of houses, separated from one another by a narrow road that follows the upper section of the Krottenbach stream. A road connects Neustift am Walde with Salmannsdorf and the Krim, a part of Unterdöbling.

== History ==
=== The origin of the name Neustift ===
The name Neustift appears for the first time in an official document of 1330. It is probably a reference to the creation of a new religious institution (Neu = new, Stift = a monastery or other religious institution) on the edge of the forest (am Walde) to the west of the village of Chlainzing after Chlainzing had been abandoned.

=== Neustift in the Middle Ages ===
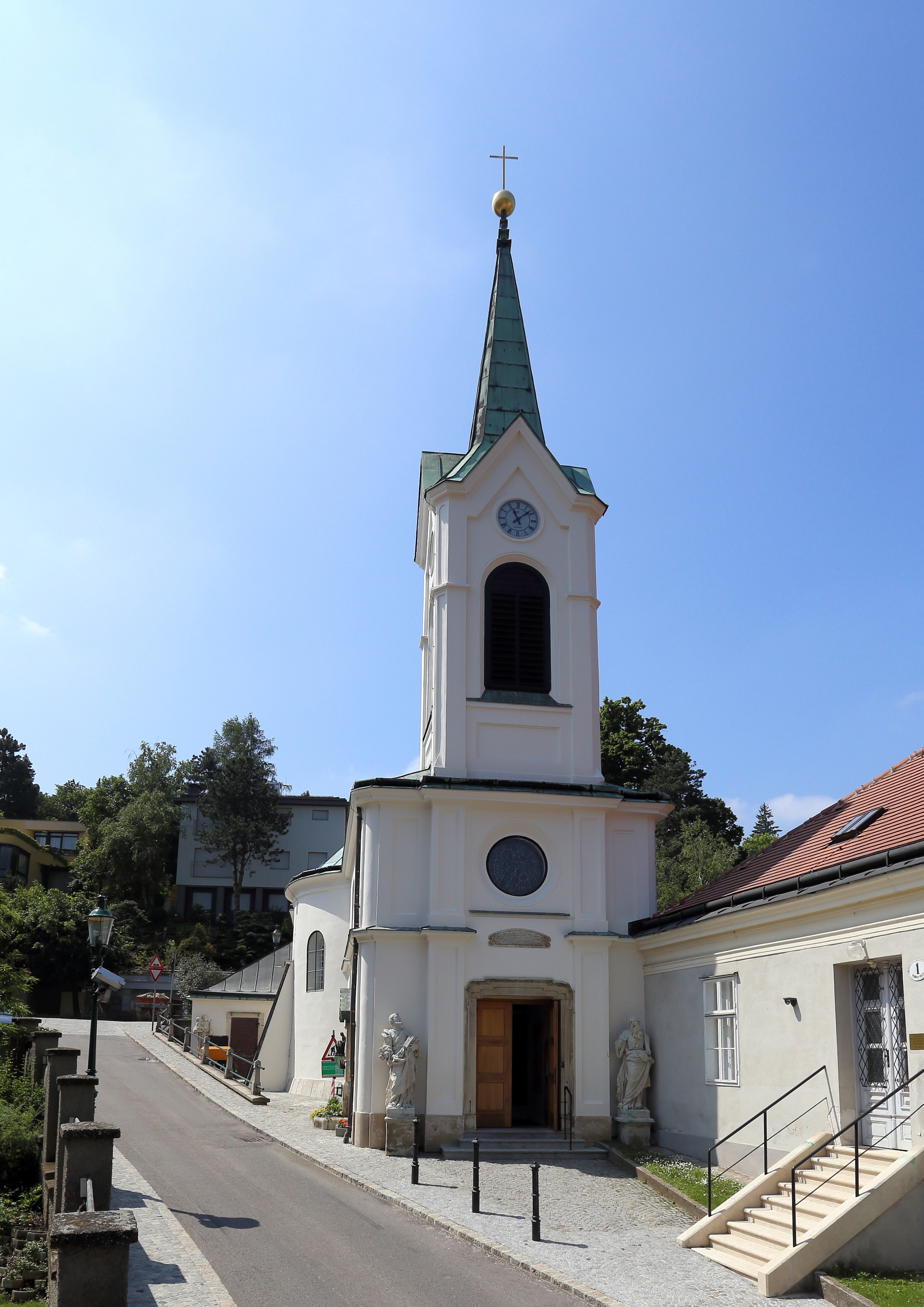
The parish church in Neustift am Walde

Neustift am Walde was probably founded to replace the village of Chlainzing. There are indications for this in its name, the "new foundation", in the shape of the settlement, as well as in the systematic deforestation and settlement of the area. The residents were farmers who were largely reliant on their own produce. They produced wine for sale. Ownership of Neustift changed on multiple occasions; the village was also included in different parishes over the years. The founding document of the parish church in Sievering from 1330 indicates that the residents of Neustift joined with the populations of Sievering and Salmannsdorf to erect a church in Sievering. Neustift was subsequently transferred from the Heiligenstadt parish to that of Sievering. In 1413, the Zink brothers sold Neustift to the priest of Gars am Kamp, who founded the Dorotheastift (Saint Dorothea's Monastery). He gave the monastery possession of Neustift in 1414. By 1435, the settlement could already boast 24 houses.

=== Neustift since the Middle Ages ===
Like the neighbouring settlements, Neustift am Walde suffered greatly during both sieges of Vienna.

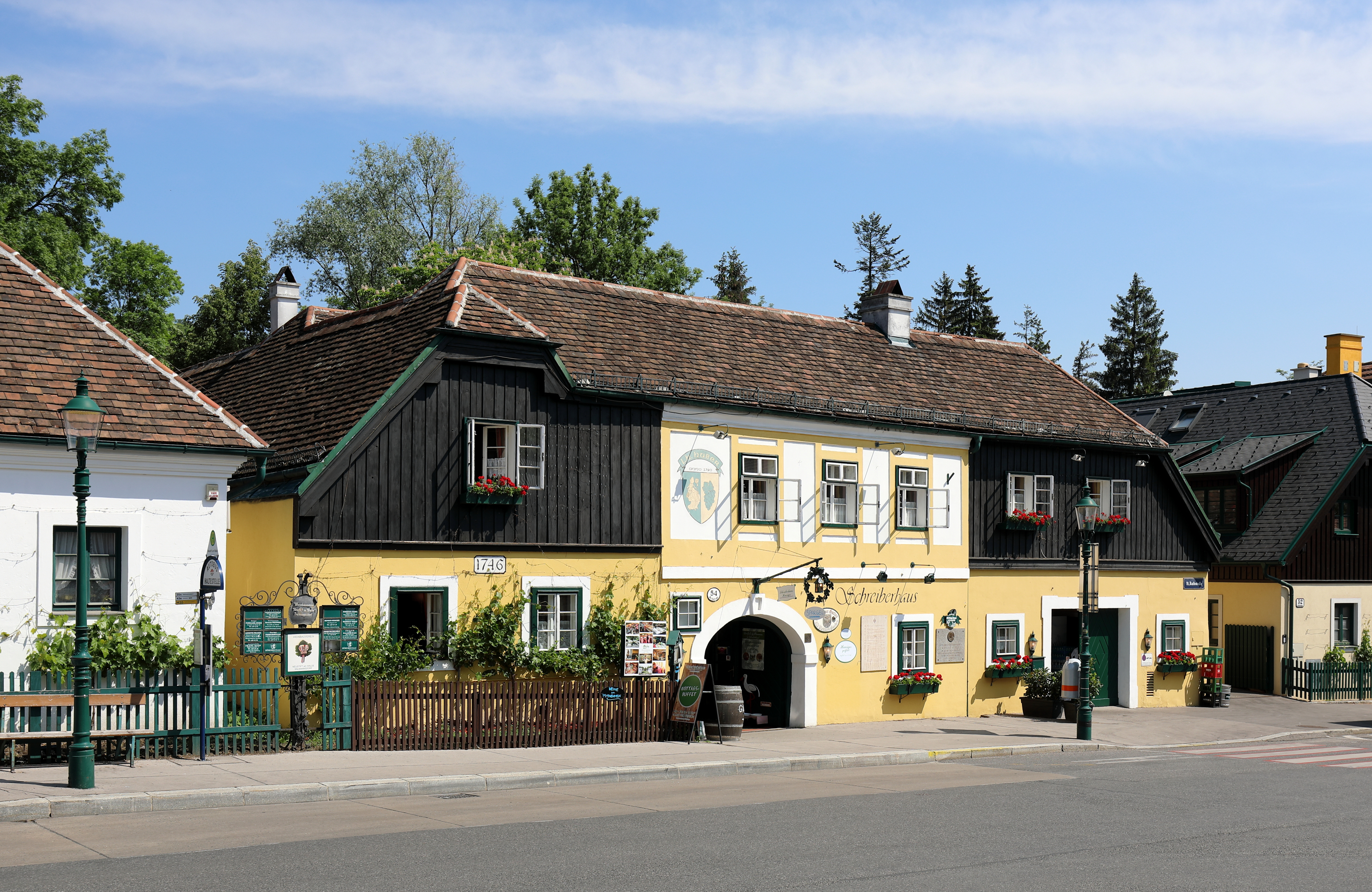
A Heuriger in Neustift am Walde

During the reign of Maria Theresa, Neustift once suffered a particularly bad wine harvest. The empress freed the village from paying taxes and in a sign of their gratitude, the vintners brought Maria Theresa a crown made of vine branches. She returned it to Neustift with the command to celebrate the church patron Saint Roch every year on 16 August. The crown is kept in the Kronenstüberl restaurant, which belongs to the Eischer family. In 1713, the plague stuck Neustift. In the same year, an Italian merchant donated funds for the Rochuskapelle (Chapel of St Roch) to commemorate its victims. When Joseph II dissolved the Dorotheastift, Neustift am Walde came into the possession of the Stift Klosterneuburg. Neustift furthermore became an independent parish and the chapel was transformed into the Neustift parish church.

Neustift had a difficult time recovering from the damage done by French troops in the Napoleonic Wars at the start of the 19th century, but from the middle of the 19th century, tourists seeking the area's fine summer weather triggered an increase in prosperity. Guest rooms were created for wealthy Viennese; several hotels were also opened. Neustift am Walde nonetheless remained a small settlement.

The threat of flooding that Neustift am Walde's proximity to the Krottenbach brought with it was finally eliminated in 1908/09 when the stream was enclosed after it had flooded the village for the last time in 1907.

In 1892, Neustift am Walde, was combined with Salmannsdorf, Währing, Weinhaus, Gersthof and Pötzleinsdorf to form the district of Währing, but in 1938 the villages of Neustift am Walde and Salmannsdorf were integrated into the 19th district (Döbling). The Neustift cemetery however remained a part of the district of Währing.

Nowadays, Neustift am Walde is popular for its numerous Heurige (restaurants selling locally produced wine). The well-attended celebration of Maria Theresa's generosity takes place every year.

=== Glanzing ===
The name of the abandoned mediaeval settlement of Chlainzing survived as a field name and was revived in 1907 for the Glanzinggasse, which at that time was in Pötzleinsdorf. Between 1912 and 1914 the Reichsanstalt für Mutter- und Säuglingsfürsorge was built at 35–39 Glanzinggasse, and in 1937 was renamed the Kinderklinik Glanzing. Systematic housing development began in the early 1920s. As part of the local government reorganisation of 1938 Glanzing was transferred to Neustift and with it to the 19th district of Vienna.

Initially the area remained within the parish of Pötzleinsdorf, but the church there was difficult to access in winter, so from either 1930 or 1934 the chapel of the clinic was made available to the new population of Glanzing. As the population grew, however, more capacity was required, but although plans for a new church existed in 1937, no progress had been made by the beginning of the war in 1939. In 1945–1946 a wooden emergency church (the Notkirche) was constructed. Glanzing was created a separate parish in 1955. The emergency church building lasted until 1970, when it was replaced by a permanent church building, dedicated to the Verkündigung des Herrn (Annunciation of the Lord), by the architect Josef Lackner in the Krottenbachstrasse, in Obersievering.

In 2016 the parishes of Glanzing, Krim and Kaasgraben were united to form the present parish of Saint Francis de Sales (Franz von Sales).

== Economy ==
The distribution of available land at the start of the 19th century makes clear the importance of both forests and vineyards for the local economy. In 1826, woods occupied one third of the land, while vineyards and pasture each occupied one quarter. Just 10 percent were used for agriculture.

== Population growth ==
In 1435, Neustift am Walde comprised 34 houses. It barely grew in the following centuries. In 1832, there were 38 houses with a total of 307 inhabitants, approximately the same number as around 40 years earlier. The growth experienced by the neighbouring villages only had a limited impact on Neustift. In 1850, it had grown to 50 houses with 575 inhabitants, and in 1890 there were 73 houses, in which 483 people lived.

== Rail, road and bus links ==
Originally, there was a wagon train that passed through Neustift to Salmannsdorf, with varying destinations in the city over the years. For financial reasons, the operation of this transport link also changed hands several times, even though it was the only such connection to receive subventions from the City of Vienna. In 1908, the Wiener Linien introduced a trolleybus operating the Mercédès-Électrique-Stoll system from Pötzleinsdorf via Neustift am Walde to Salmannsdorf. This was one of the longest-serving routes using this system and it was only replaced in 1938 by an omnibus with the route number 23. The route was however cancelled the following year.

In 1928, a bus running along the Krottenbachstraße to Neustift and Salmannsforf was introduced (from 1935 the number 20). Because this route took it past factories that were necessary for the war effort, this was the last bus route in Vienna that was still running in World War II. In 1942, preparations were made to introduce trolleybuses, which happened in 1946, but in 1958, motor-powered buses were re-introduced. From 1945 to 1961, this was the route number 22; thereafter and until 1972, it bore the number 39A, and since then, it has been the number 35A. This bus runs from the Spittelau station along the Krottenbachstraße via Neustift am Walde to its final destination in Salmannsdorf.
