= Schenkenberg (Vienna) =

Hill in Vienna

Coordinates: 48°15′25″N 16°19′20″E

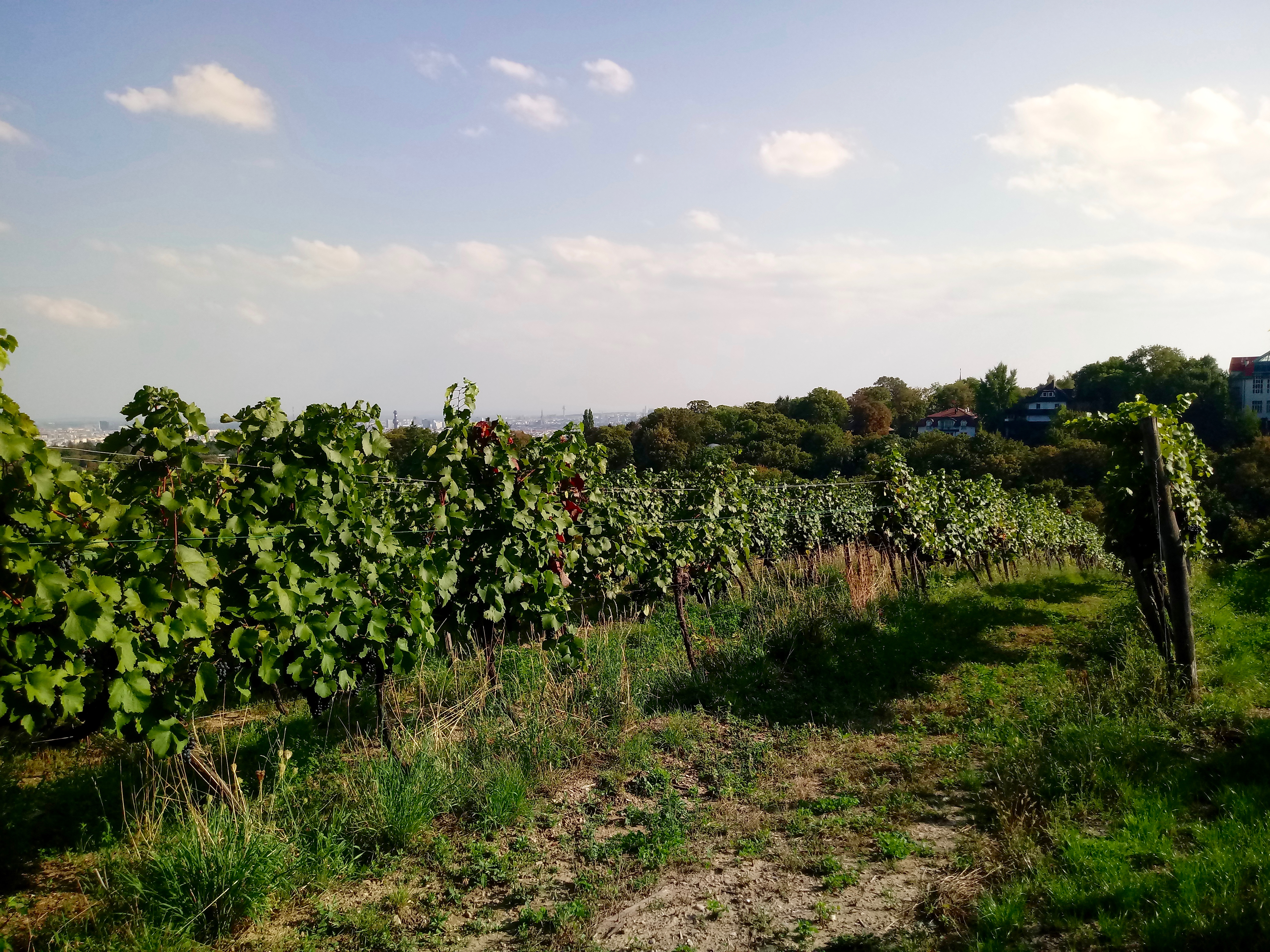
View from Reisenberg to Schenkenberg

The Schenkenberg is a hill in the 19th district of Vienna, Döbling. It is 345 metres tall.

== Geography ==
The Schenkenberg lies in Obersievering and represents the south-eastern extension of the Pfaffenberg. To the north, the Reisenbergbach separates the Schenkenberg from the Reisenberg; to the south, the Arbesbach divides it from the Hackenberg. The Schenkenberg is part of a north-eastern chain of foothills belonging to the eastern Alps. It is composed of flysch containing quartz, limestone, marl, and other conglomerates.

== History ==
The first documentary reference to the Schenkenberg dates from 1329 and dubs it in dem Schenkenberge. The name Schenkenberg is probably a reference to the Mundschenk family, which owned land in the area. The Kuenringer, who also owned property in this area, were called the Oberste Schenken.

Today, the Schenkenberg is surrounded by numerous vineyards.
