= 226 Weringia =

Main-belt asteroid

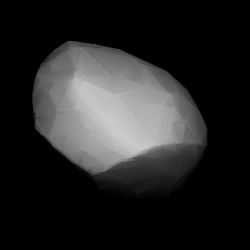
- 3D model based on lightcurve data

Discovery
- Discovered by: Johann Palisa
- Discovery date: 19 July 1882

Designations
- Pronunciation: /vɛˈrɪŋɡiə/
- Named after: Währing
- Alternative designations: A882 OA, 1912 CC
- Minor planet category: Main belt

Orbital characteristics
- Epoch 31 July 2016 (JD 2457600.5)
- Uncertainty parameter 0
- Observation arc: 133.57 yr (48786 d)
- Aphelion: 3.26370 AU (488.243 Gm)
- Perihelion: 2.16153 AU (323.360 Gm)
- Semi-major axis: 2.71261 AU (405.801 Gm)
- Eccentricity: 0.20316
- Orbital period (sidereal): 4.47 yr (1631.9 d)
- Average orbital speed: 18.09 km/s
- Mean anomaly: 14.8722°
- Mean motion: 0° 13^{m} 14.189^{s} / day
- Inclination: 15.9657°
- Longitude of ascending node: 134.970°
- Argument of perihelion: 154.117°

Physical characteristics
- Dimensions: 33.83±1.5 km
- Synodic rotation period: 11.147 h (0.4645 d)
- Geometric albedo: 0.2035±0.020
- Temperature: unknown
- Spectral type: unknown
- Absolute magnitude (H): 9.9

226 Weringia is a typical main-belt asteroid. It was discovered by Johann Palisa on 19 July 1882, and was named after Währing, part of Vienna, the city where the asteroid was discovered. Photometric observations during 2008 showed a rotation period of 11.1496 ± 0.0009 hours and a brightness variation of 0.20 ± 0.02 in magnitude.
