= Währing =

Währing Währing (Bavarian)
- 18th District of Vienna
- Coat of arms

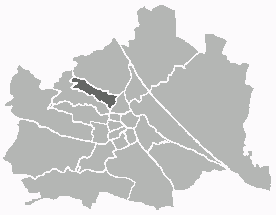
- Location of the district within Vienna

- Location within Vienna
- Coordinates: 48°13′59″N 16°18′53″E
- Country: Austria
- City: Vienna

Government
  - District Director: Silvia Nossek (Green)
  - First Deputy: Robert Zöchling (Green)
  - Second Deputy: Johannes Schreiber (ÖVP)
  - Representation (40 Members): Greens 19, ÖVP 7, SPÖ 6, FPÖ 3, NEOS 4, KPÖ 1

Area
  - Total: 6.28 km^{2} (2.42 sq mi)

Population (2016-01-01)
  - Total: 50,285
  - Density: 8,010/km^{2} (20,700/sq mi)
- Postal code: 1180
- Address of District Office: Martinstraße 100; 1181 Wien

Währing (German pronunciation: [ˈvɛːʁɪŋ]) is the 18th district of Vienna and lies in northwestern Vienna on the edge of the Vienna Woods. It was formed in 1892 from the unification of the older suburbs of Währing, Weinhaus, Gersthof, Pötzleinsdorf, Neustift am Walde and Salmannsdorf. In 1938 Neustift am Walde and Salmannsdorf were annexed to the neighbouring 19th District (Döbling).

== Geography ==
=== Location ===
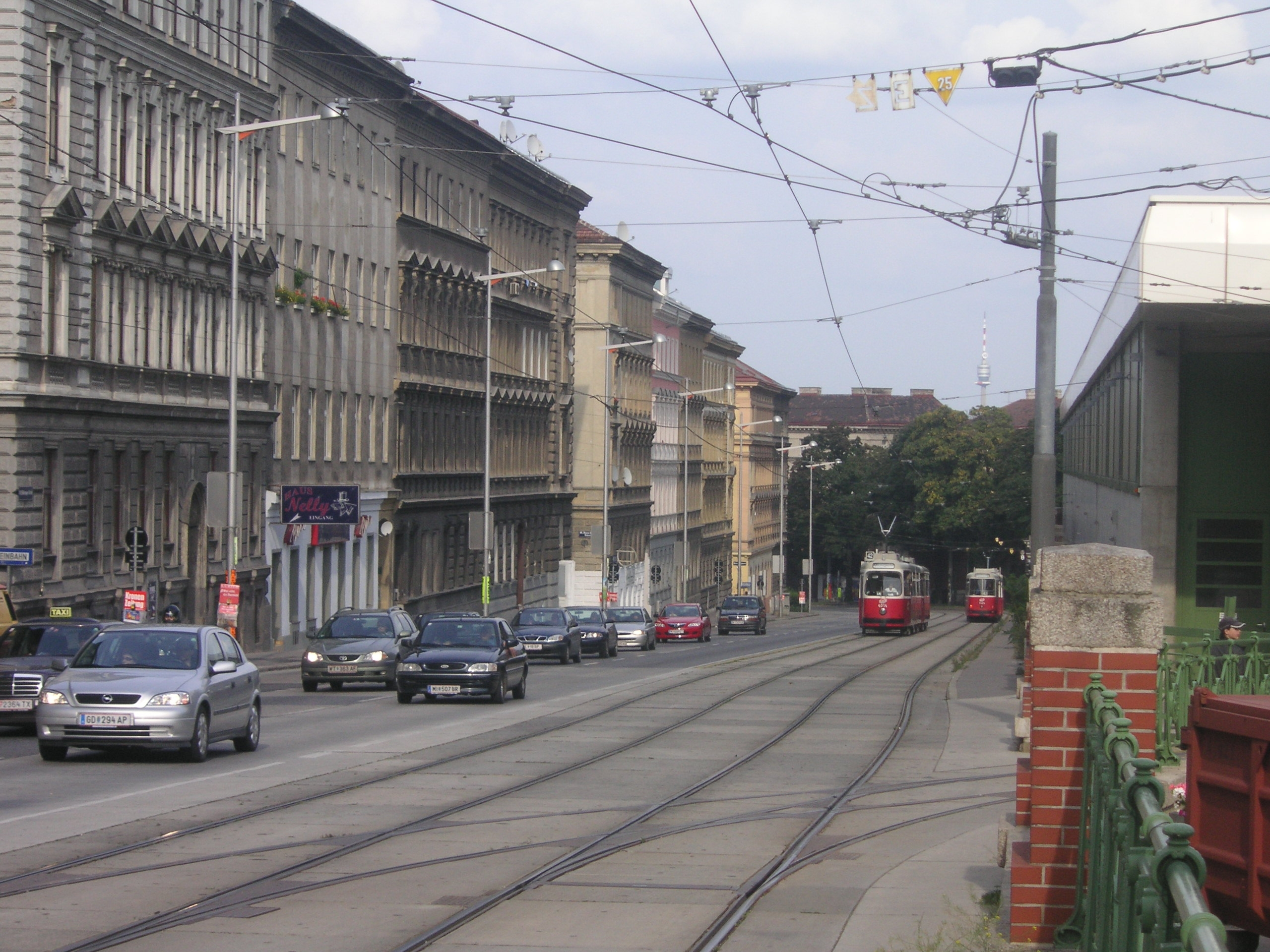
Währinger Gürtel, the eastern boundary of the district

Währing covers 6.28 km2 in northwestern Vienna on the slopes of the Wienerwald between the Gürtel and the Höhenstraße. The district ascends from the steep banks of the (now channeled and enclosed) Währinger Stream on both sides. It is bordered to the north by the 19th District (Döbling), to the east by the 9th District (Alsergrund) and to the south and west by the 17th District (Hernals).

=== Geology ===
Währing lies between two ridges to the north and south. The hills of Schafsberg and Michaelerberg belong to the Wienerwald and form part of the boundary of the Vienna Basin. The hills in Währing consist of multi-layered sandstone alternating with clay, except for the high grounds of Pötzleinsdorf and Türkenschanze, which are of sands. In the lower parts of the district one finds deposits of the stone tegel; at higher elevations mostly hard sands, rocks and boulders. On the road Schafberggasse limestone was uncovered during construction of a canal: due to the former location of the Tethys Ocean, various remnants of marine life can be found beneath the district. Numerous sand quarries in the area provided building material for centuries.

=== Hills ===
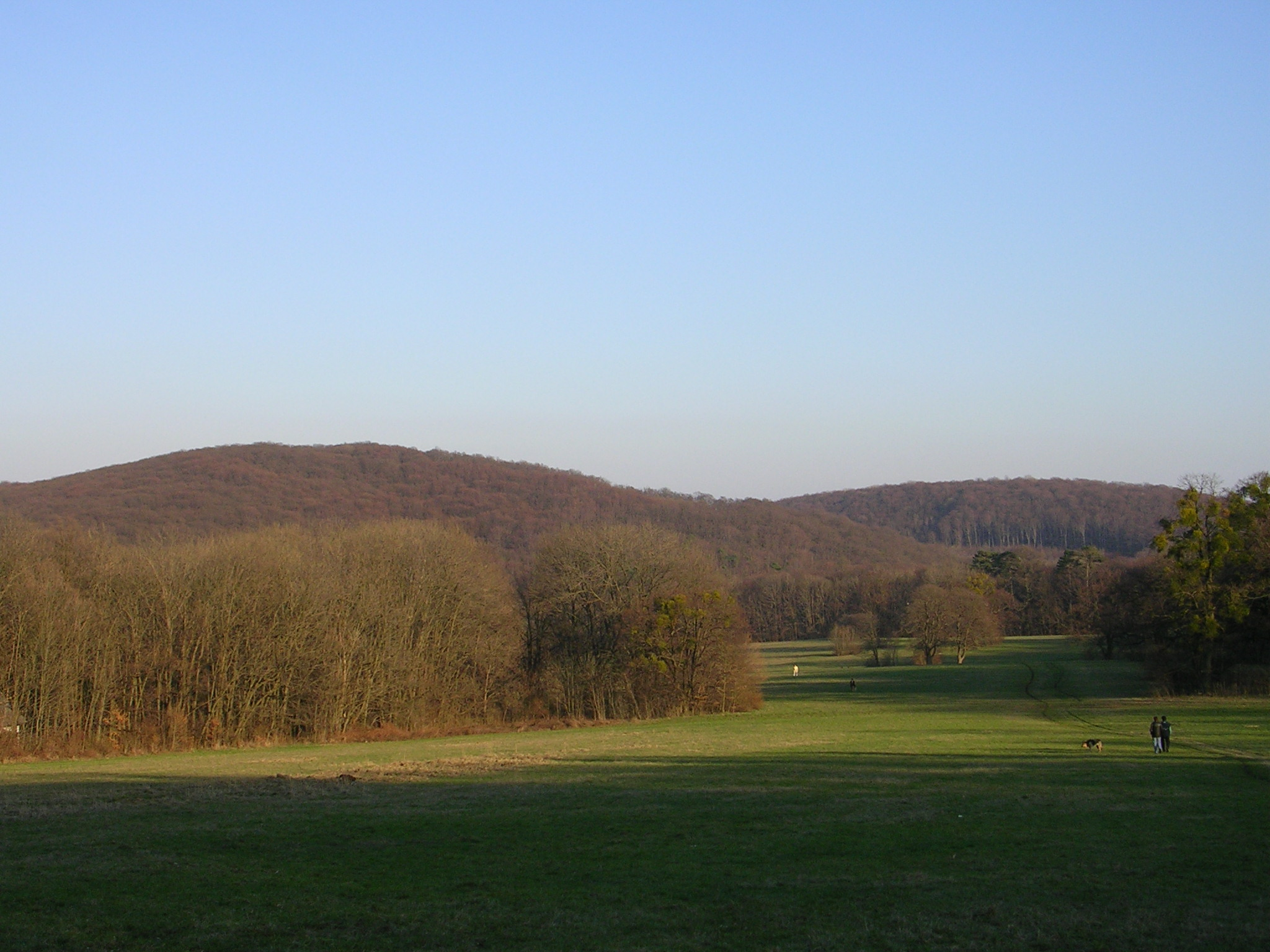
Michaelerberg and Schafberg seen from Schwarzenbergpark

Währing is enclosed between two elongated ridges extending from the northwest to the south and forming the valley of the Währinger Stream. The Schafberg range lies to the south, running from the largely forest-covered Schafberg (390 m) through Kleiner Schafberg (305 m), Mitterberg and Ganserlberg up to the Gürtel. To the north the district is bordered by spurs of the Michaelerberg (387 m), which lies on the western border with the 17th District and is almost completely forested. Its spurs extend through the Pötzleinsdorfer Höhe and the Windmühlhöhe to the southeast until they reach the plateau of Türkenschanze. The Ladenburghöhe, which border Pötzleinsdorfer Schlosspark to the south, lie between the two ridges and run parallel to and northeast of the Schafberg range.

=== Watercourses ===
In the 19th Century the district was still defined by the Währinger Stream, which rises in Pötzleinsdorfer Schlosspark. Originally this stream was in a deep valley along the route of the streets Pötzleinsdorfer Straße, Gersthofer Straße, Gentzgasse and Währinger Straße, and flowed into the River Als in the 9th District. By the end of the 19th Century it had been completely transformed into a drain. The last open-flowing part of the stream system is a stretch of the Dürwaring Stream, near Schafbergbad south of the Ladenburghöhe.

=== Neighbourhoods ===
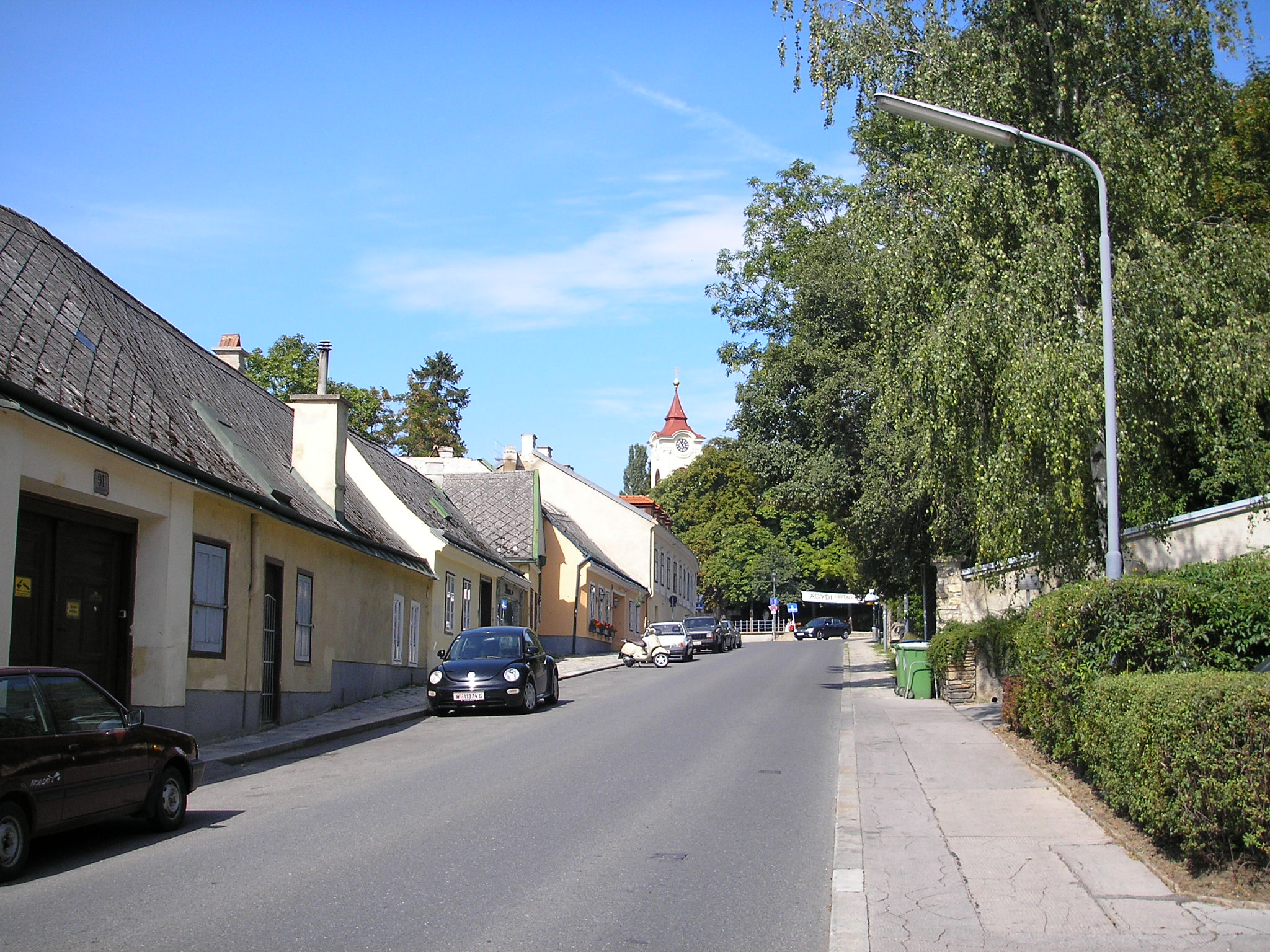
Old town centre of Pötzleinsdorf

The district was formed in 1892 from six previously independent outer suburbs, of which Salmannsdorf and Neustift am Walde were annexed to the neighbouring 19th District in 1938. From east to west the remaining suburbs were Währing (the original, eponymous outer suburb), Weinhaus, Gersthof and Pötzleinsdorf.

An alternative subdivision of the district is given by the census areas used for official statistics. For Währing these are Währinger Cottage, Gentzgasse, Kreuzgasse, Gersthof and Pötzleinsdorf (with Gersthof and Pötzleinsdorf on this list having different boundaries from their respective historical suburbs).

=== Land use ===
Währing comprises 53.6% built-up areas (compared to 33.2% Vienna-wide), of which 92.83% are residential. Green space occupies 30.2% of the district: woodland 14.4%, parkland 7.9%, meadows 3.0%, allotments 2.9%, sports fields 1.3% and agriculture (vineyards) 0.6%. Transport areas rank third, accounting for 16.2% of the total land area.

== History ==
The most spectacular individual group of the Austrian resistance against National Socialism during the Second World War was that of the Währing priest Heinrich Maier. The center of the group was on the one hand the parish church of St. Leopold in Gersthof and the villa of Franz Josef Messner on Hasenauerstrasse. This very successful Catholic resistance group very successfully passed on plans and production facilities for V-1, V-2 rockets, Tiger tanks and aircraft (Messerschmitt Bf 109, Messerschmitt Me 163 Komet, etc.) to the Allies. The resistance group, later discovered by the Gestapo, was in contact with Allen Dulles, the head of the US OSS in Switzerland. With the location sketches of the production facilities, the Allied bombers were able to carry out precise air raids and thus protect residential areas. The information was important to Operation Crossbow and Operation Hydra, both preliminary missions for Operation Overlord. In contrast to many other German resistance groups, the Maier group provided information about the mass murder of Jews very early on through their contacts with the Semperit factory near Auschwitz. There are memorial plaques both at the parish church and in Hasenauerstrasse.

=== Toponymy ===
The first mention of Währing is in documents from around 1170, as Warich. The name could plausibly come from Slavic (var for a warm spring) or Germanic (werich for a plot of land that a farmer can work for a day) origins. It could also come from Werigandus, the first abbot of Michaelbeuern Abbey. The name could also go back to Slavic land acquisitions: Döbling from toplica, warm stream, and Währing from varica, dark stream.

== Population ==
At the 2008 census the population of Währing was 47,861, down from a high point of 87,658 in 1910. The average age is slightly above that of Vienna as a whole. In 2001, the proportion of people over 60 was about 25% in Währing compared to 22.2% in the city as a whole.

In 2005 the proportion of expatriate residents stood at 23.7%, up from 17.9% in 2003. The greatest number of expats came from Serbia & Montenegro, 6.4% of the total population. Another 3.1% were Nigerian citizens, 1.6% Turkish, 1.4% Polish and 1.1% Eritreann. According to a 2001 survey, 52.8% of the population declared themselves Catholic, with significant minorities belonging to the Eastern Orthodox Church, Islam, and Evangelic churches. The five Roman Catholic parishes in the district make up the 18th City Deanery.

== Culture and sightseeing ==
=== Architecture ===
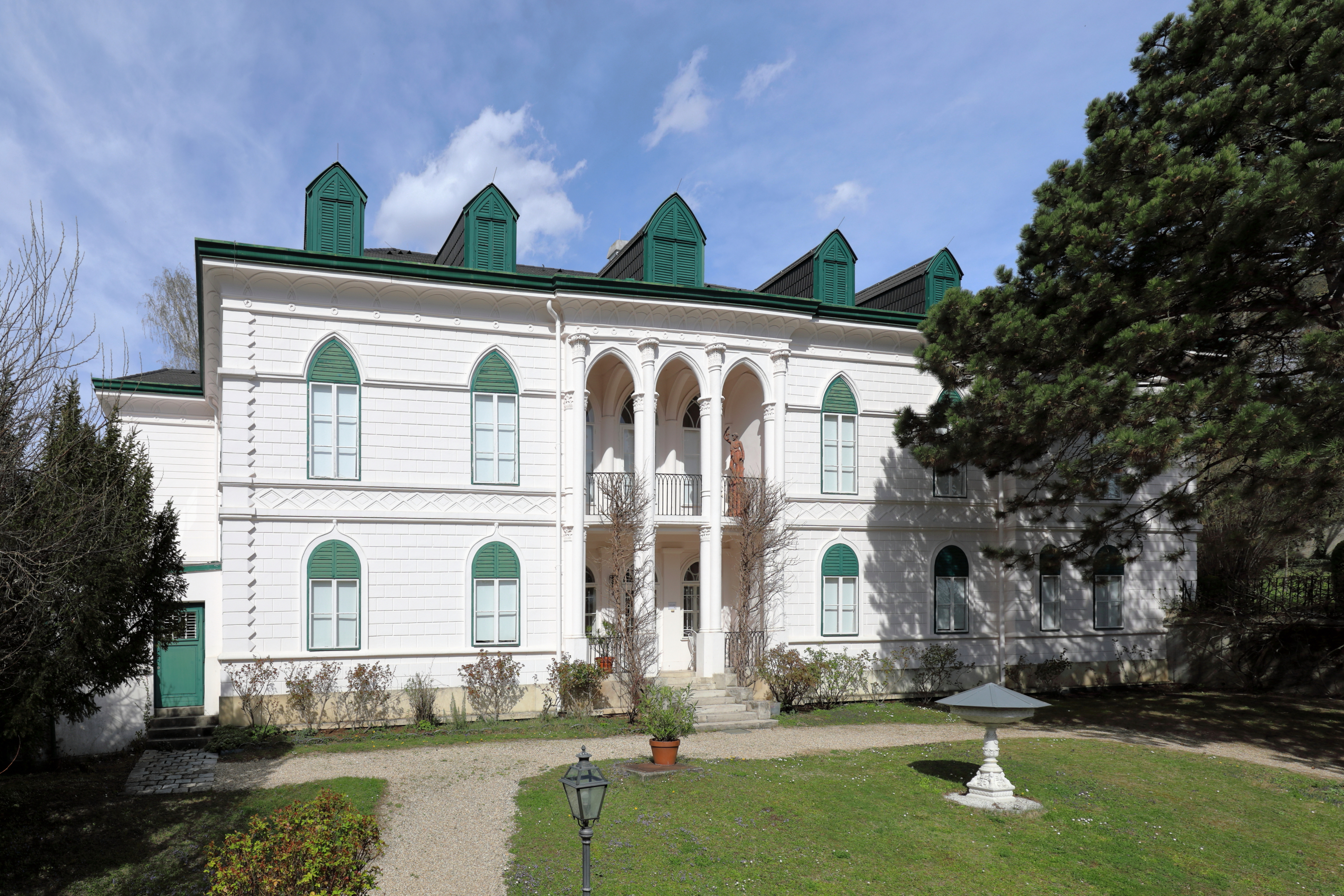
Geymüllerschlössel in Pötzleinsdorf

Interesting castles and villas include the Geymüllerschlössel, the Schloss Pötzleinsdorf with its extensive parks, and numerous villas in the Cottageviertel. The Baroque churches in the district are Ägydiuskirche (St. Giles' church) in Pötzleinsdorf, the Johannes Nepomuk Chapel in Gersthof and the Währinger Pfarrkirche, which was greatly expanded in 1934. Several churches were built in the historicism style: the Gersthofer Pfarrkirche, Lazaristenkirche, the Lutherkirche and the Wienhauser Pfarrkirche. The Pötzleinsdorfer Pfarrkircher is a notable church building from the 1960s.

=== Theatre ===
Currently there are three small stages in the district, the “Theater des Augenblicks”, the “Rampenlicht-Theater” and the “Theaterlabor”.

=== Museums ===
Währing’s most important museum is a branch of the Museum of Applied Arts (MAK) in the Geymüllerschlössel in Pötzleinsdorf. There is also the Währing District Museum and the Österreichische Sprachinselmuseum.

=== Parks ===
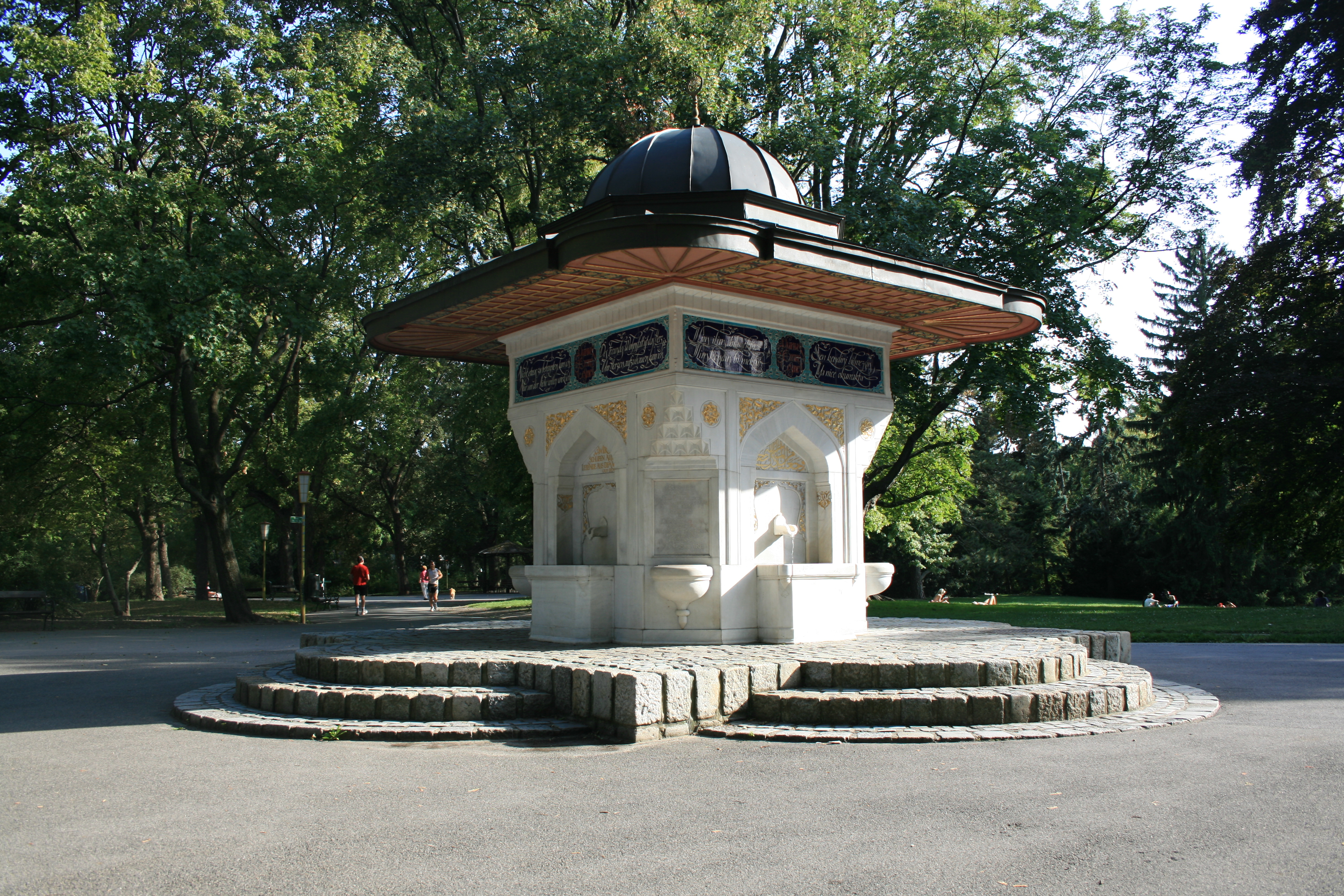
Yunus-Emre-Brunnen in Türkenschanzpark, a gift from Turkey to Austria

Währing has several large parks. The best known are the Pötzleinsdorfer Schlosspark, Türkenschanzpark, and the Währingerpark (formerly a cemetery). The Schubert Park (see below) and the non-public Sternwartepark (“Observatory Park”) are also noteworthy.

=== Cemeteries ===
Währing has two cemeteries of note. Währing Cemetery, now known as Schubert Park, is the site of the original burial places of composers Ludwig van Beethoven and Franz Schubert. The graves of both composers were moved to the Zentralfriedhof in Vienna in 1888, but there remains a bust of Schubert in memory of his original resting place. This bust was made by sculptor Josef A. Dialer. The epitaph written by Franz Grillparzer reads in German: Die Tonkunst begrub hier einen reichen Besitz aber noch viel schönere Hoffnungen (The art of music buried here a rich possession and yet much finer hopes.)

The Jewish Cemetery, Währing, opened in 1784, was the main burial site for members of the Israelitische Kultusgemeinde Wien and formerly lay within the border of Währing. (Today, however, due to boundary changes, the cemetery, despite its name, is no longer part of the 18th Vienna district of Währing, but belongs to Döbling, the 19th district.) Besides the St. Marx Cemetery it is the last remaining cemetery of Vienna in the Biedermeier style. After its closure in the 1880s, it was partially destroyed during the time of the Third Reich, and is now only partly accessible due to its increasing decay. A long-running debate over the restoration of the cemetery has been taking place since 2006 between politicians of the federal and local levels as well as experts.

== Astronomy ==
The asteroid 226 Weringia was discovered in 1882 from Währing and named in its honor.
