= Hackenberg (Vienna) =

Hill in Austria

Coordinates: 48°15′08″N 16°18′56″E

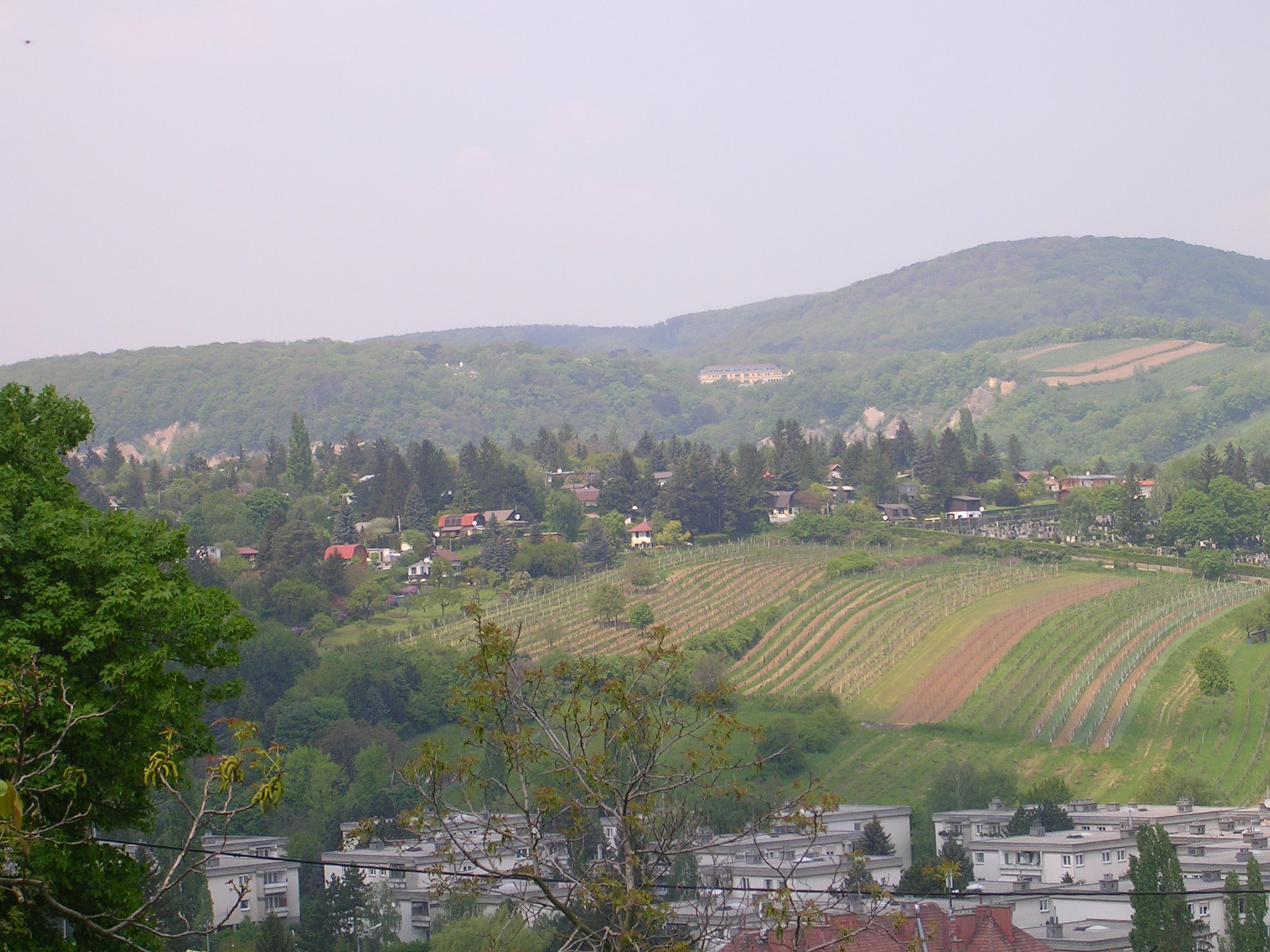
Hackenberg seen from the Dr.-Meißner-Park

The Hackenberg is a hill in the suburb of Sievering in the 19th district of Vienna, Döbling, Austria. It is 306 metres tall.

Hackenberg is covered in sand and gravel. The Arbesbach flows around the hill's north-eastern flank, while the Krottenbach flows around its south-western flank, although both rivers have been enclosed in canals in this area. The hill extends as far as the Krim (an area in Unterdöbling) in the west.

The Hackenberg is first mentioned in a contract of purchase drawn up for Rudolph I of Bohemia, which refers to it as “hakkenperge”. The name derives from the old field measurement Haken; older theories that Hackenberg derives from the personal name Hacko have since been disproved.

In the Middle Ages, the village of Chlaintzing stood on the south-western slope of the Hackenberg. It was surrounded by vineyards but was later abandoned. Today, the Hackenberg is covered with small settlements, but a few vineyards have also survived.

Just below the peak of the Hackenberg, on the side facing the Krottenbachstraße, is a fresh water catchment for the city of Vienna. The Sieveringer Friedhof (cemetery) was established on the southwestern side of the hill in 1883.
