= Arbesbach (river) =

Stream in Döbling, Vienna, Austria

Coordinates: 48°15′24″N 16°18′39″E

The Arbesbach, also known as the Erbsenbach and Sieveringerbach, is a stream in Döbling, the 19th district of Vienna, Austria. The stream, partially enclosed in a canal, is the most important tributary of the Krottenbach. Almost all of its 4.3 kilometres (2.7 mi) lie within the suburb of Sievering.

== Geography ==
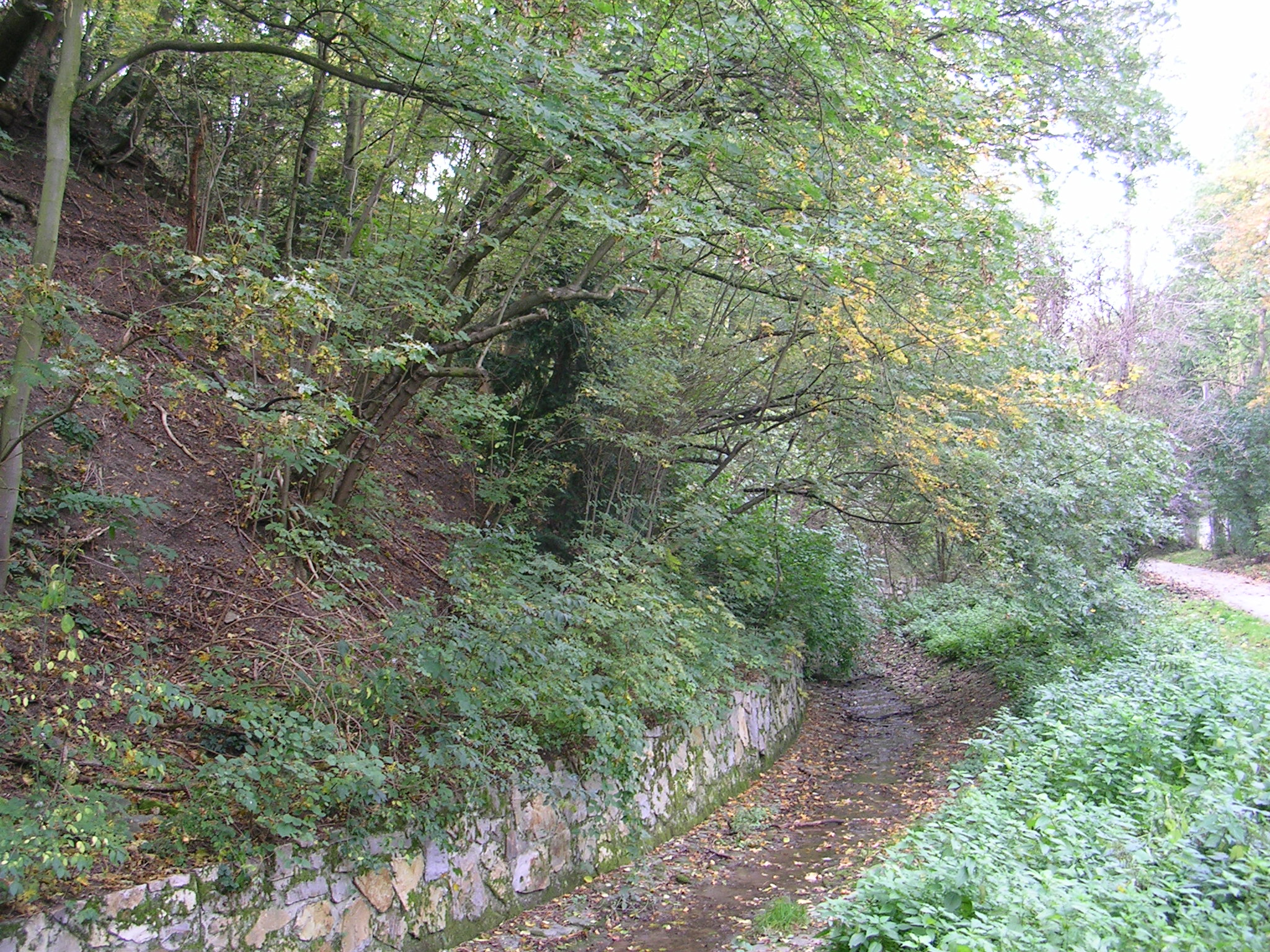
The Arbesbach shortly before enters the canal

=== Geology ===
The Arbesbach, which makes its way through the Vienna Woods, is characteristic for streams in low mountainous areas (Mittelgebirge). Because the ground does not absorb much rainfall, the level of water in the stream can change rapidly when it rains heavily, resulting in flash flooding. The Arbesbach rises in the woods and runs over relatively steep ground that has been heavily eroded.

=== Course ===
==== Headwaters ====
Several springs in the area between the Dreimarkstein and the Latisberg flow together to form the headwaters of the Arbesbach. The most northerly springs rise to the south of the Jägerwiese and between the Latisberg and Vogelsangberg. These meet to the north of the Hartgrabenwiese and are quickly joined by another three springs, which rise at Am Himmel (Pfaffenberg) and to the south of the Rohrerwiese. The Arbesbach flows from this point onward along the left-hand side of the Sieveringer Straße. The most easterly tributary, the Gereutebach, rises to the east of the Dreimarkstein and runs along the Spießweg before flowing into the Arbesbach at the point where the stream crosses to the right-hand side of the road to run between it and the Spießweg.

==== Middle and lower reaches ====
From the point at which it reaches the Gspöttgraben in Obersievering, the Arbesbach is partially enclosed. From number 223 in the Sieveringer Straße onwards, the stream still follows its own course, but it is almost entirely enclosed. Just past the Agnesgasse (at number 168 in the Sieveringer Straße), the Arbesbach empties into a canal behind the row of houses on the side of the street with odd house numbers. The canal is 1.3 metres wide and 1.8 metres deep. Originally, the Arbesbach continued along this side of the street as far as the Sievering parish church, where it turned off behind the right-hand line of houses before diagonally crossing to the opposite side of the street again at the Brechergasse. Thereafter, the stream flowed past the former Helenenbad near the Schatzlsteig towards the Windhabergasse and then carried on where there is now a footpath between the Windhabergasse and the Sieveringer Straße. Upon reaching the Börnergasse, the Arbesbach finally left the main street and turned into the Gräfweg. From there, its course took it along the Arbesbachgasse, which is named after the stream. It continued in a line from here to empty into the Krottenbach below the former private lunatic asylum.

== History ==
The name Arbesbach hearkens back to the Middle High German erbiz or arwis (pea). This is a reference to the plants that used to grow along the banks of the stream, which were for the most part wild peas. In the past, the untamed Arbesbach frequently caused flooding in Sievering as a result of the geology of the Wienerwald. The streams in the Wienerwald were also often used to dispose of refuse and sewerage. In order to combat the risk of flooding and to reduce the annoyance caused by smells emerging from the stream, efforts to enclose the Arbesbach began between 1894 and 1896. The first section to be enclosed measured 1,364 metres and extended from the point where the stream meets the Krottenbach to house number 83 in the Sieveringer Straße. By 1908, there were already plans to extend the cover, because the smells had become too strong. These plans could however not be realised due to local residents’ demands for compensation. The extension of the cover as far as number 175a in the Sieveringer Straße, a further 983 m (3,225 ft), only took place between 1954 and 1955. Following a flood in summer 1959, the cover was extended as far as the Agnesgasse in the 1960s.
