= Sievering =

Suburb of Vienna

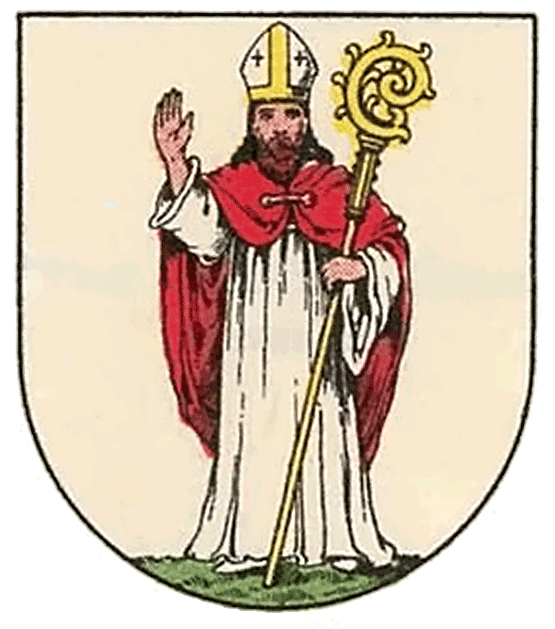
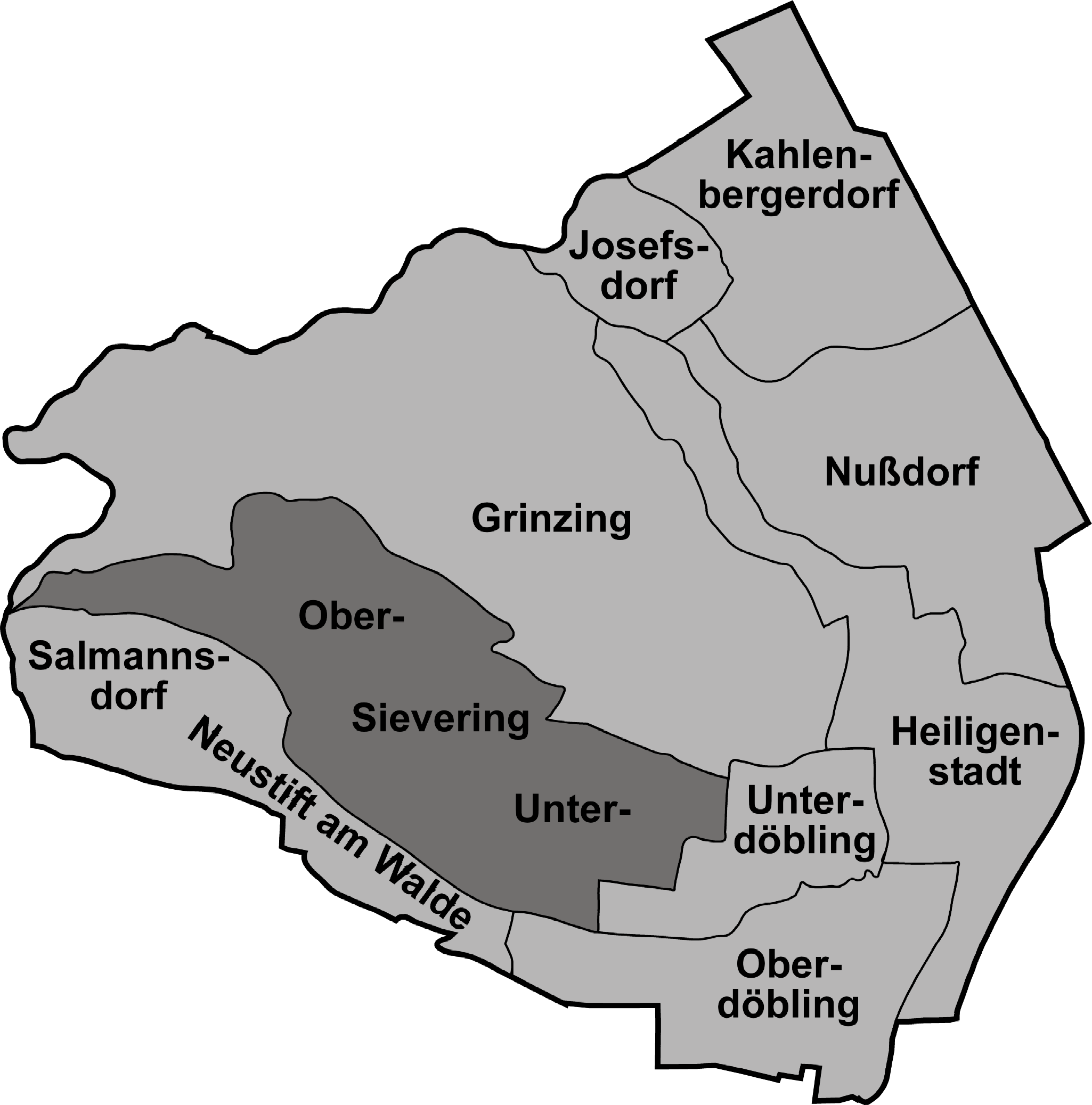
Sievering
Coat of arms	Map
AUT Sievering COA
Location: 48°15′08″N 16°19′15″E

Sievering is a suburb of Vienna and part of Döbling, the 19th district of Vienna. Sievering was created in 1892 out of the two erstwhile independent suburbs Untersievering and Obersievering. These still exist as Katastralgemeinden.

For many years it was home to the Sievering Studios, one of Austria's leading film studios.

== Geography ==
Sievering arose on the banks of the Arbesbach. The more modern distinction between Obersievering and Untersievering coincides with the route of this stream; Obersievering (Upper Sievering) lies between the Schenkenberg and Hackenberg and therefore upstream of Untersievering (Lower Sievering), which lies to the south of the Meiselberg. An abandoned village named Mitterhofen once lay between the two Sieverings. It was the earliest settlement, consisting of a group of houses around a chapel, but it was subsumed by the towns to either side of it. Chlaintzing, another village which stood on the south-western slope of the Hackenberg, was probably abandoned in the 14th century. A lack of water may have forced the inhabitants to relocate to Neustift am Walde. Obersievering and Untersievering arose when the winegrowing subjects of local landowners settled around the Meierhöfe in both towns. They were mentioned in 1330 for the first time as separate settlements under the names Ober-Sufferingen and Under-Sufferingen; it is not clear which of the two arose first. The local church stood on the border between the two towns and the towns grew together over time. The modern-day Katastralgemeinden Untersievering and Obersievering cover a total area of 433.04 hectares, although the border of these Katastralgemeinden does not concur precisely with that of the area given the name Sievering in statistical analyses conducted by the Austrian government, which also consists of two smaller units.

== History ==
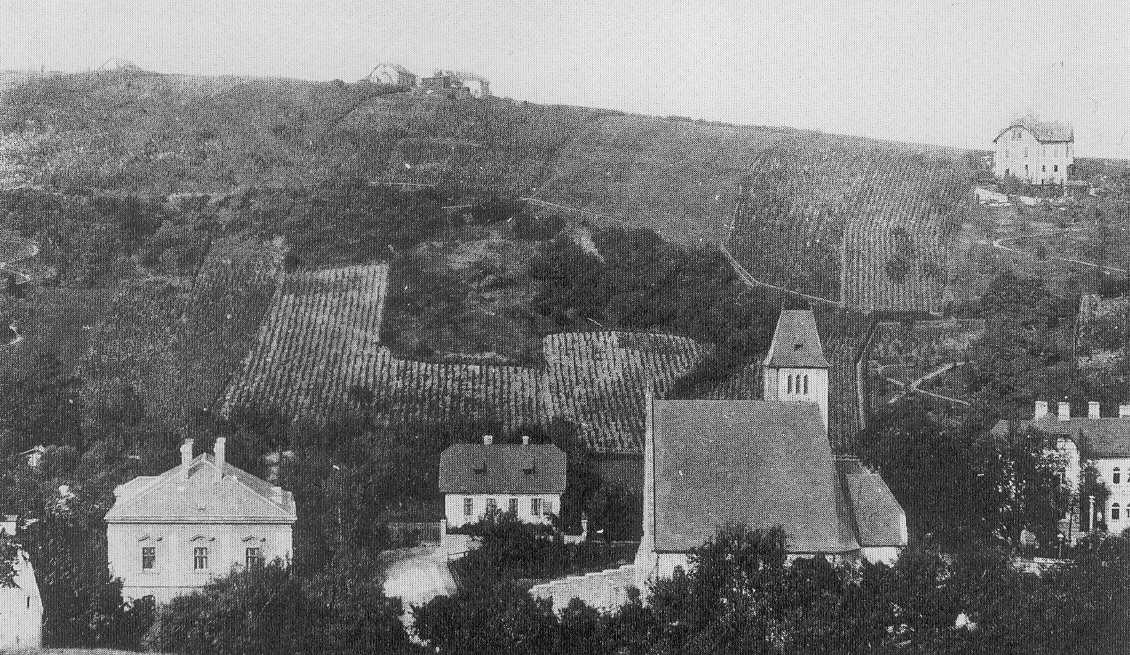
The parish church in Sievering around 1900

=== The origin of the name Sievering ===
The first official mention of Sievering dates to 1114 and names it Sufringen. Over time, the name evolved into Suueringan, Sivring and finally into Sievering. The affix -ing in many Germanic place names has the meaning the place of the people belonging to; Sievering thus means the place of the people belonging to a man named Suver(o)/Sufr. A link was probably made to Saint Severinus of Noricum in the Middle Ages, who is believed to have been a missionary in the area at the start of this period. Severinus is depicted in Sievering's coat of arms and the Sieveringer Pfarrkirche, a Roman-Catholic church in Sievering, is dedicated to him.

=== Sievering from the Roman Empire to the end of the Middle Ages ===
At the time of the Roman Empire, there was a large quarry in Sievering, from which stones were used in the construction of the military base Vindobona. There was certainly also a fairly large worker colony. In 1897, a Mithraeum was uncovered at number 132 in the Sieveringer Straße. It was built by the 10th Legion and is now in the City of Vienna's historical museum. In the Middle Ages, the inhabitants were farmers who were essentially reliant on their own produce. Wine was produced for sale. The division of Sievering into Obersievering and Untersievering took place in the 14th century; this was documented for the first time in 1330. In 1334, the area was granted to the Klosterneuburg Monastery, but it was returned to the crown in the 15th century. Both Obersievering and Untersievering knew several rulers until they were finally handed to the Hofkammer (Chancellery) in Vienna. A chapel dedicated to Saint Andrew is mentioned in 1330. In 1348, this chapel was transformed into the Sieveringer Pfarrkirche; the first priest is named as Jacob de Medlaer. The Klosterneuburg Monastery did not take over the parish until 1510.

=== Sievering since the Middle Ages ===
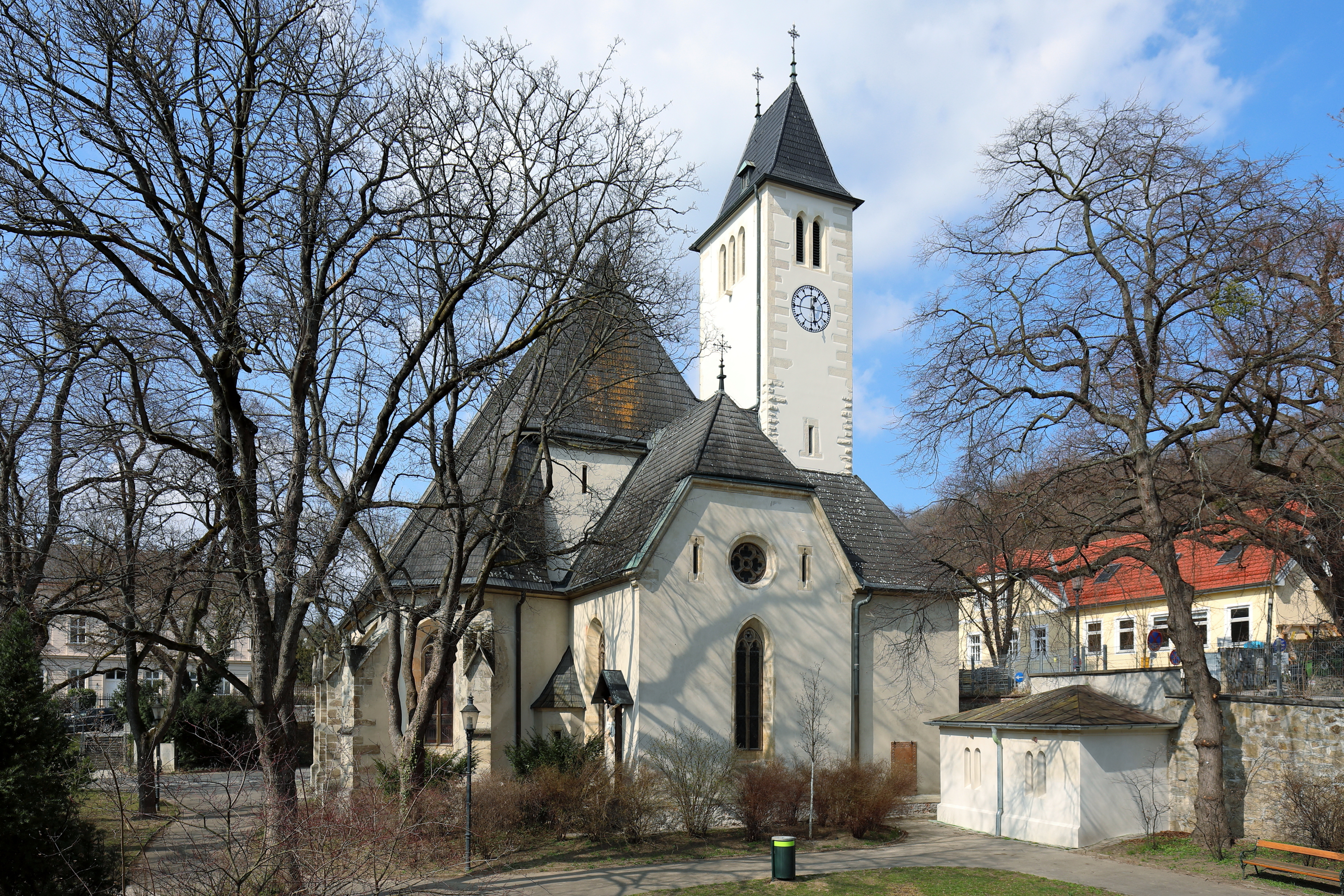
The parish church in Sievering today

Sievering and the surrounding settlements suffered greatly during the Ottoman wars in Europe, which greatly impeded their development. In 1634, Obersievering and Untersievering once again received new rulers; Obersievering went to the Camaldolese from Kahlenberg, while Untersievering went to the Gaming Monastery. When the plague hit Vienna in 1713, Sievering suffered particularly badly. 30 of the 33 houses in Obersievering were afflicted, in Untersievering the numbers were 32 of 34. 267 people in all died of the plague in Sievering. In the following decades, Obersievering developed much less rapidly than Untersievering as a result of its cooler, moister climate and poor transport links. In 1767, Obersievering had 41 houses and 26 farmhouses, while Untersievering had just 5 farmhouses. By 1819, Untersievering had overtaken the settlement further upstream - in its 56 houses, Untersievering had 467 inhabitants, while in Obersievering, 377 people were living in 52 houses. From 1789 onwards, private individuals built canals and ponds, planted fruit trees, bred sheep, set up a park and built a farmhouse. In 1832, wood merchant Josef Müller was finally able to reunite both settlements under one owner. He later sold them to Anton Edler von Wirth, who had also purchased Oberdöbling in 1824.

When they were integrated into the city of Vienna in 1892 together with Unterdöbling, Oberdöbling, Heiligenstadt, Nußdorf, Grinzing, Josefsdorf and Kahlenbergerdorf, Obersievering had 626 inhabitants and Untersievering 1,996. Obersievering consisted of 78 houses, Untersievering 214. Around 1900, large apartment blocks were built in the lower Sieveringer Straße, and the surrounding hills were gradually built over. The old centres of Obersievering and Untersievering are nonetheless still recognisable. Tram line 39, which used to run to Sievering, was opened in 1902.

== Economy ==
At the start of the 19th century, both parts of Sievering had large vineyards. In the somewhat smaller Untersievering, half of the available land was given over to growing wine. Agriculture took up another third. In Obersievering, 28% of available land were covered with vineyards, followed by 20% forest, 15% pasture and 15% fields. The quarry, which had been in use since Roman times, and which belonged to the City of Vienna, was economically important. It provided cobblestones and whetstones until it closed in 1921. Unlike nearby Grinzing or Neustift am Walde, Sievering was not considered an attractive summer destination and grapes grew more slowly in the cool valley than on the surrounding hilltops. The roads connecting Sievering with the surrounding areas were also very poor well into the 19th century. Nonetheless, factories were gradually established here as well and in 1837 a wagon line connected Sievering with Vienna for the first time. In 1875, the expansion of Untersievering began, while the gradual fencing in of the Arbesbach provided protection from floods.

In 1897, carpenter Wenzl Hartl founded a noteworthy steam-driven sawmill at number 2 in the Sieveringer Straße. The sawmill grew quickly as the construction industry became more professional, but was moved to Lower Austria in 1948. Terraced houses and the Franz Josef Hotel took its place. It was however the automobile factory Gräf & Stift that held the title as the largest enterprise in Sievering. Its factory in the Weinberggasse, which was opened in 1904, produced cars, trucks, and busses. The site was replaced with residential housing after production was moved step-by-step to Liesing.
