= Henikstein =

Austrian noble family

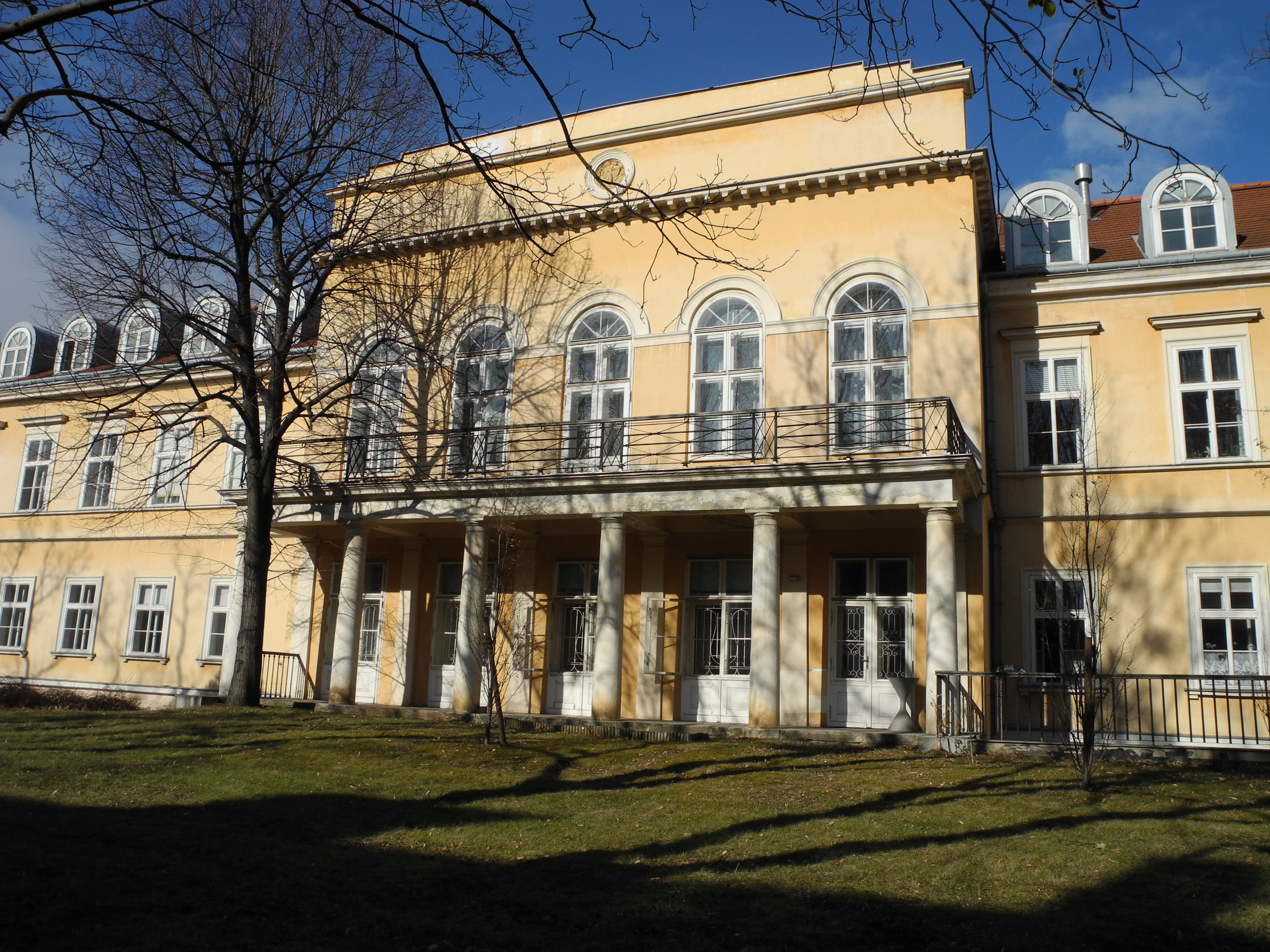
Henickstein villa in Vienna

The Henikstein family is an Austrian noble family that descended from a clan of Jewish merchants.

== History ==
One of the most notable members was Adam Adalbert Hönig (1740-1811), who later got elevated to the nobility and became Edler von Henikstein. There was also Joseph von Henikstein (1768-1838), who was a prominent patron of Austrian arts and was a convert to Catholicism. During the Austro-Prussian war of 1866, his son Alfred Freiherr von Henikstein was a general on the Austrian side and became the Chief of General Staff.

- Joseph von Henikstein
- Alfred Freiherr von Henikstein (1810, Oberdöbling - 1882, Vienna), son of Joseph

== See also ==
- Hönig
- Henig
- Honig
