= Hönigsberg =

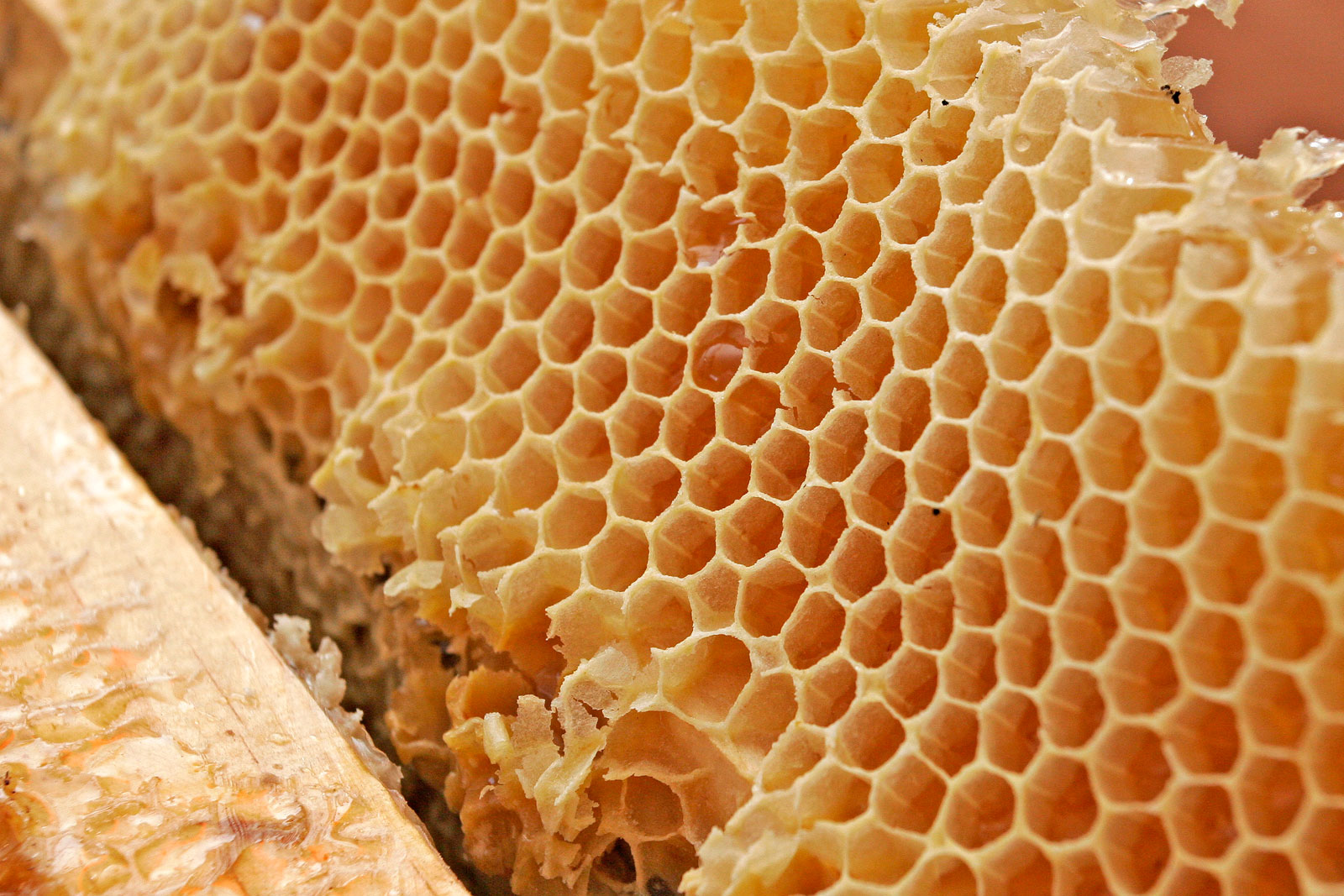

Origin
- Language: German
- Meaning: honey - mountain
- Region of origin: Poland, Austria

Other names
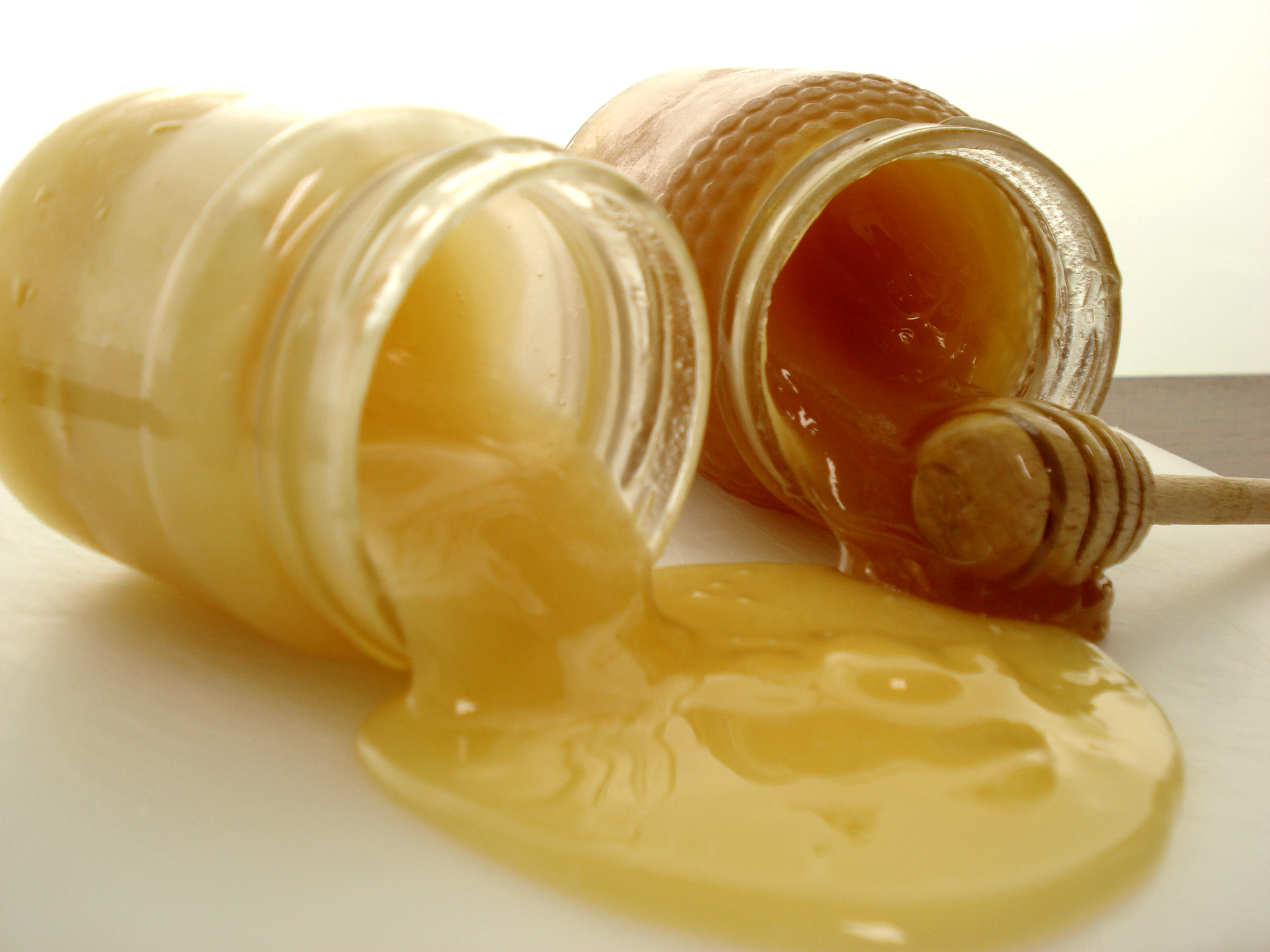
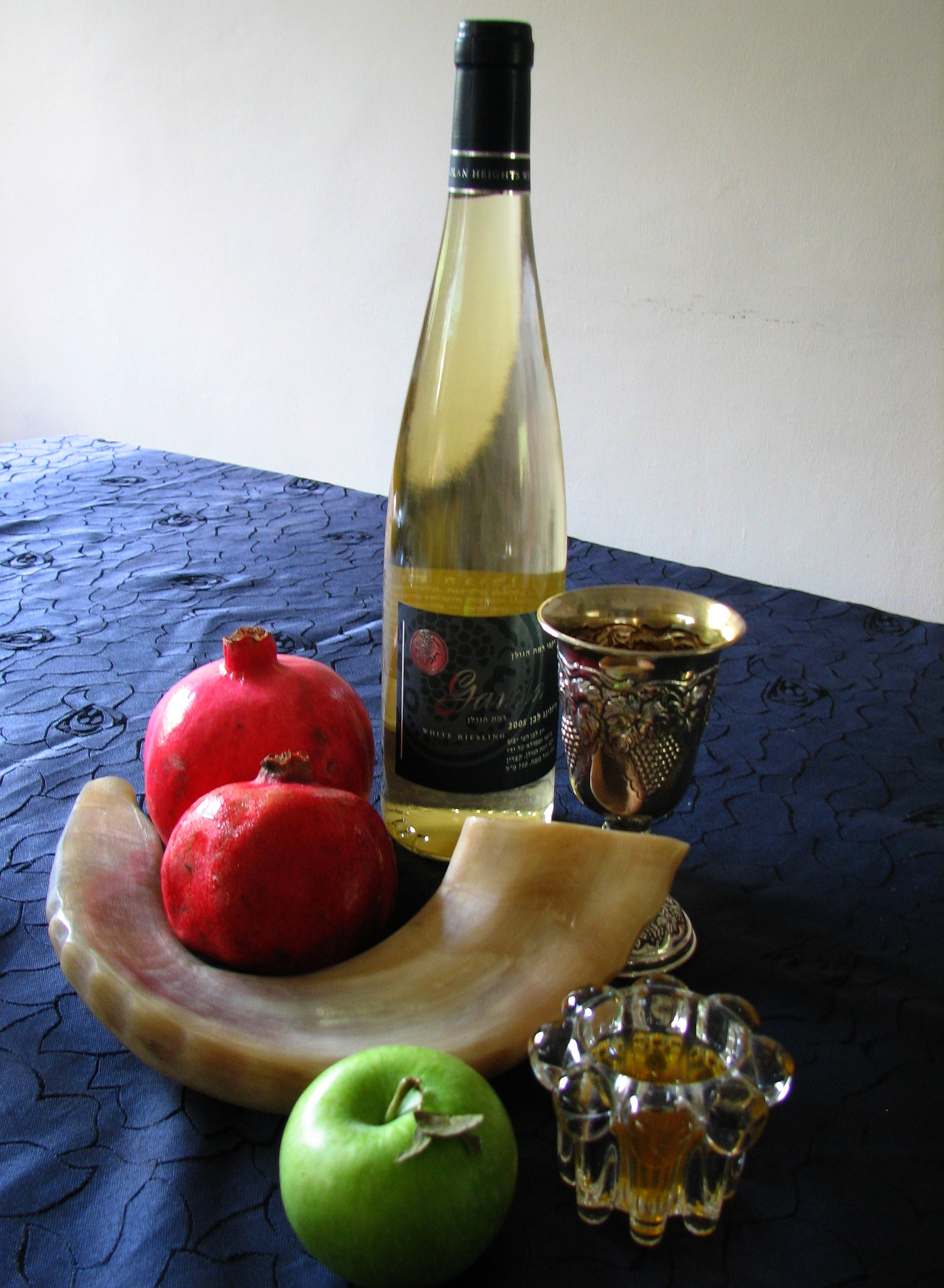
- Variant forms: Hönig, Honig, Henig, Honigberg, Honigbaum, Honigsbaum, Hönigswald Roysh'e'shone

Hönigsberg is surname of:

- David Hönigsberg (1959–2005), a South African classical composer, conductor and musicologist
- Margarete Hilferding, née Hönigsberg (1871–1942)
- Leo Hönigsberg, famous Croatian architect and co-owner of the architecture studio Hönigsberg & Deutsch
- Nicolae Hönigsberg, Romanian footballer
