= Joseph von Henikstein =

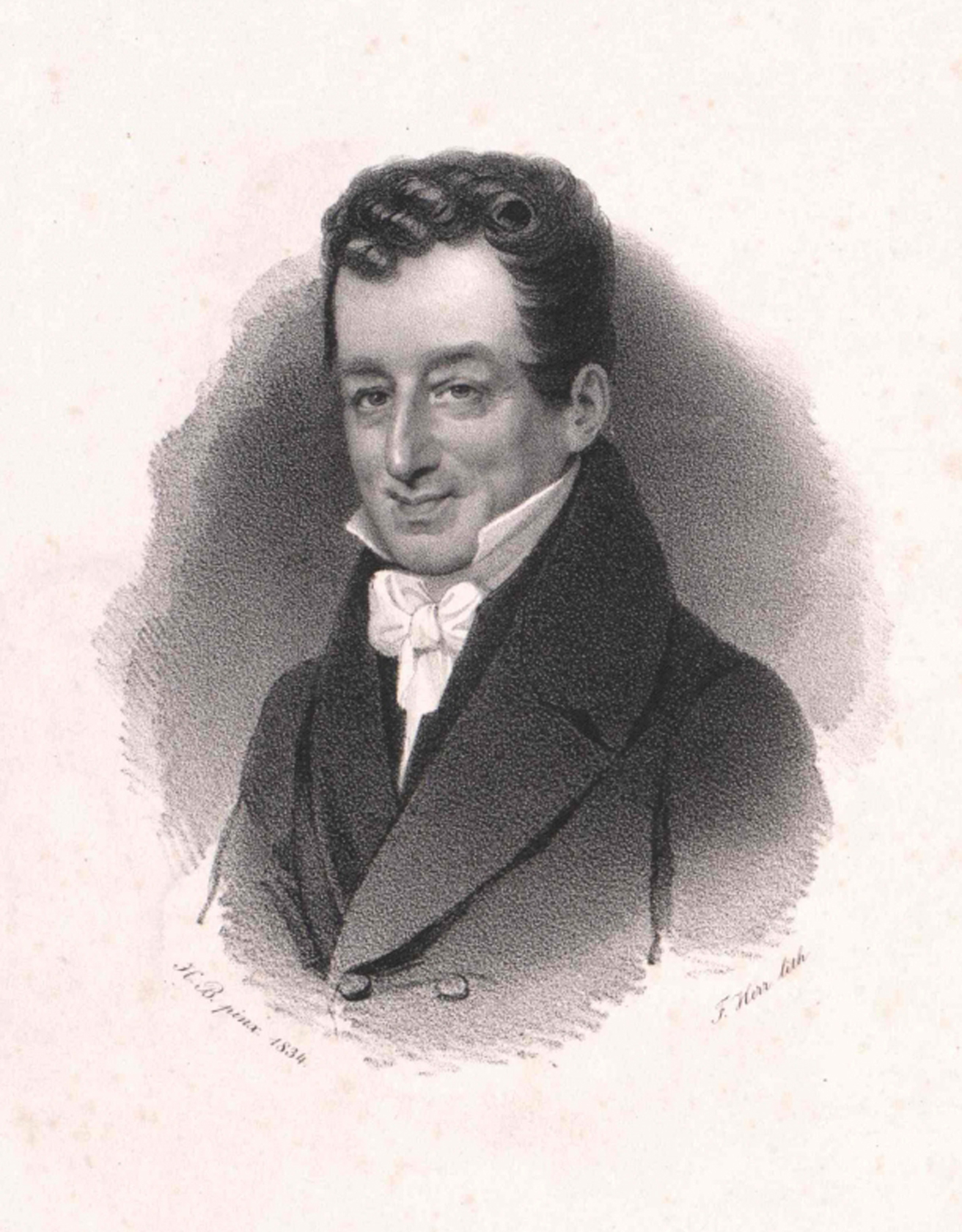
Lithograph by Faustin Herr, 1834

Joseph Ritter von Henikstein (1768 – April 29, 1838) was a Jewish businessman and financier. He was a patron of the arts, and a friend of Wolfgang Amadeus Mozart.

Born in Leimen, Baden, Henikstein was married to Elisabeth von Sonnenstein (1770–1823). His daughter Caroline was married to Joseph von Hammer-Purgstall, the diplomat and translator of Oriental literature. His youngest son was Alfred von Henikstein. Joseph von Henikstein died in Vienna, Austria.

Joseph von Henikstein was an imperial and royal privileged wholesaler and owner of Henikstein and Comp., as well as one of the first directors of the Austrian National Bank, founded in 1818. In his two residences in downtown Vienna and at his country estate in Oberdöbling, there were frequent house concerts where prominent musicians played music together with family members.
