= Döbling Parish Church =

Parish church in Vienna, Austria

Coordinates: 48°14′33″N 16°21′01″E

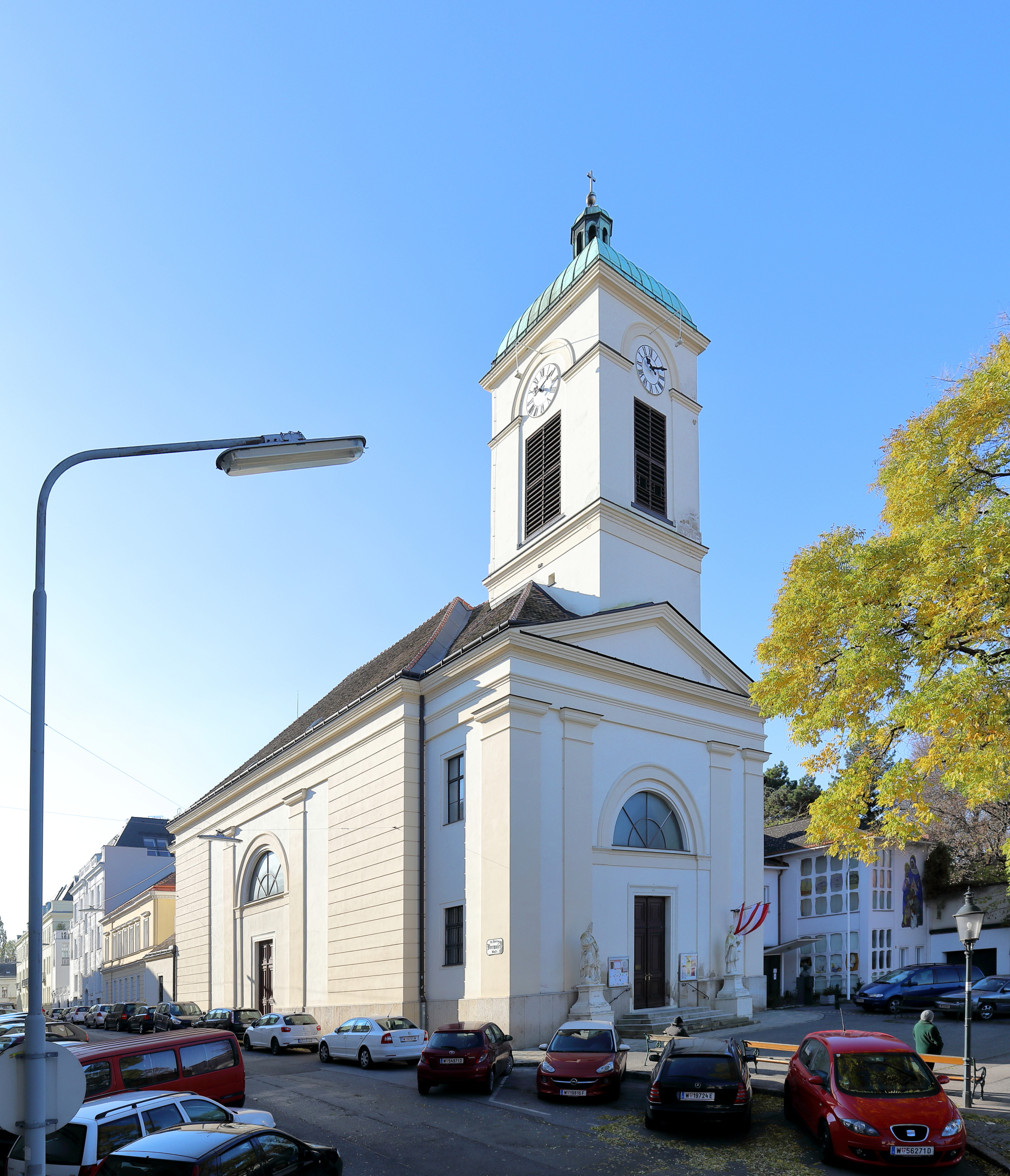
Döbling Parish Church

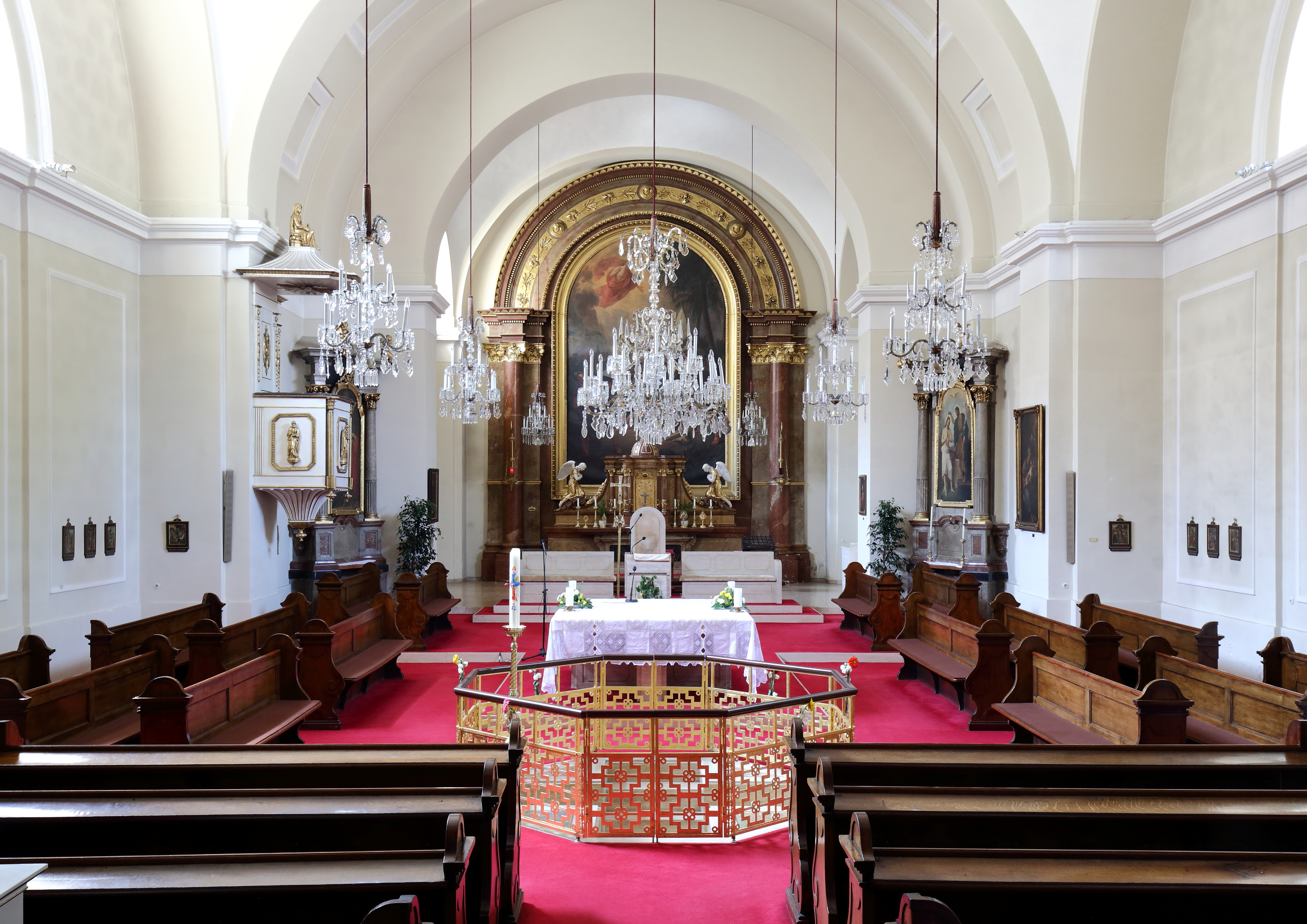
View of inside

The Döbling Parish Church (Döblinger Pfarrkirche) is a Roman Catholic parish church in the suburb of Oberdöbling in the 19th district of Vienna, Döbling.

== History ==
The first reference to a church in Döbling dates from 1267, when a Ecclesia in Tobelico (church in Döbling) was mentioned in an official document, but it is not known where this church stood. The continuous existence of a church can be proven from the 15th century, as the names of the Döbling parish priests have been recorded since that time.

The Döbling Parish Church was destroyed by Matthias Corvinus of Hungary in the 15th century, but it was quickly rebuilt. In 1640, the parish of Döbling was dissolved and the area was allocated to the parish of Währing. The church was destroyed for a second time during the second siege of Vienna in 1683; the remains were shored up but not rebuilt. The Johann-von-Nepomuk-Kapelle in the Döblinger Hauptstraße was used as a replacement until the parish church was restored following emperor Joseph II’s reform of the parishes and the restoration of Döbling to the status of an independent parish.

The church however quickly proved to be too small. It was rebuilt between 1826 and 1828 in line with designs drawn up by Josef Reininger and dedicated to Saint Paul. The church features a Baroque main room; its temple-like appearance is typical for the period. The church’s three most prominent artistic features are the picture on the altar Bekehrung des heiligen Paulus (The conversion of Saint Paul) by Josef Schönmann (1829), the pictures on the side altars, which these are the work of J. Kreßler, the pulpit, which dates from the early 19th century, and a wooden statue of Mary dating from the 18th century.
