= Leimen (Baden) =

- Town
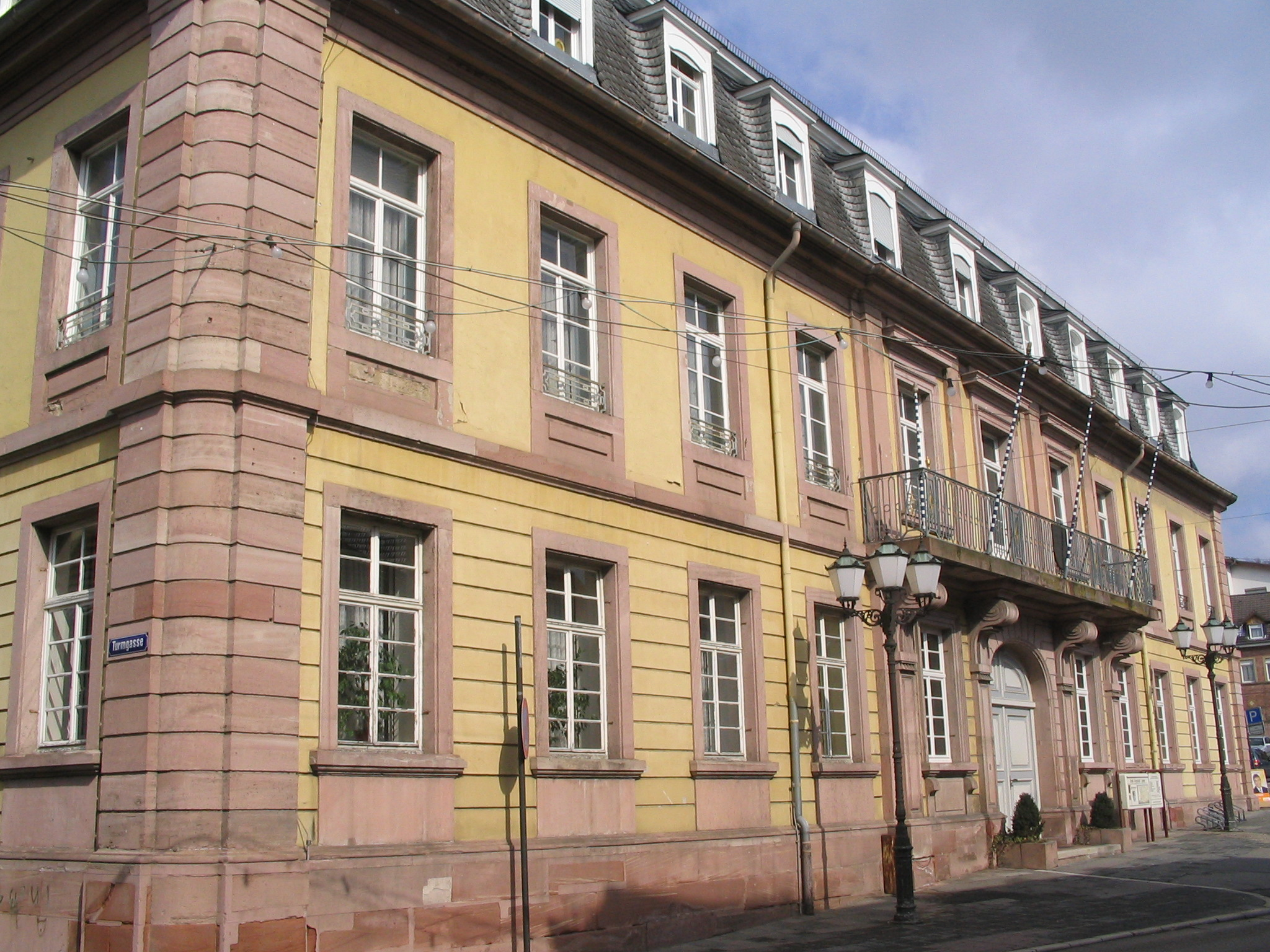
- Town hall

- Coat of arms

- Location of Leimen within Rhein-Neckar-Kreis district
- Interactive map of Leimen
- Location within Germany Location within Baden-Württemberg
- Coordinates: 49°20′53″N 08°41′28″E
- Country: Germany
- State: Baden-Württemberg
- Admin. region: Karlsruhe
- District: Rhein-Neckar-Kreis

Government
  - Mayor (2024–32): John Ehret

Area
  - Total: 20.64 km^{2} (7.97 sq mi)
- Elevation: 118 m (387 ft)

Population (2025-12-31)
  - Total: 26,815
  - Density: 1,299/km^{2} (3,365/sq mi)
- Time zone: UTC+01:00 (CET)
  - Summer (DST): UTC+02:00 (CEST)
- Postal codes: 69181
- Dialling codes: 06224, 06226
- Vehicle registration: HD
- Website: www.leimen.de

Leimen (German pronunciation: [ˈlaɪmən]; Palatine German: Lome) is a town in north-west Baden-Württemberg, Germany. It is about seven kilometres (4 1/2 miles) south of Heidelberg and the fourth largest town of the Rhein-Neckar district after Weinheim, Sinsheim and Wiesloch. It directly borders the Heidelberg district of Rohrbach. Leimen is also the area's industrial centre.

Leimen is located on the Bergstraße (Mountain Road) and on the Bertha Benz Memorial Route.

In the context of a communal reform in the 1970s, Leimen was newly created from the villages Leimen, Gauangelloch and Sankt Ilgen. In 1981, the state government of Baden-Württemberg granted Leimen the privilege to be called "town." When Leimen's population exceeded 20,000 in 1990, the city council applied for elevation to a Große Kreisstadt which was granted by the state government on 1 April 1992.

== History ==
The first documentary record of Leimen is from 791, when both the Lorsch Abbey and the Diocese of Worms owned land there. First records of the districts are from 1270 for Gauangelloch (a document supposedly from 1016 was found out to be a fake), 1312 for Lingental, around 1300 for Ochsenbach and 1100 for Sankt Ilgen, then called bruch, an Old High German word for bog.

In 1262, the lords of Bruchsal gave Leimen to the Electorate of the Palatinate as a fiefdom and from 1464 on Leimen was part of the Palatinate. In 1579, Leimen was granted the right to celebrate an annual fair and became a marketplace in 1595. In 1674, Leimen was partially destroyed.

== Mayors ==
- Johann Ludwig Waldbauer 1838–1844
- Heinrich Seitz 1845–1876
- Jakob Rehm III. 1876–1882
- Leonhard Schneider 1882–1883
- Ludwig Endlich 1883–1896
- Christoph Lingg 1883–1923
- Jakob Weidemaier 1923–1933
- Fritz Wisswesser 1933–1945
- Jakob Weidemaier 1945
- Georg Appel 1946–1948
- Otto Hoog 1948–1976
- Herbert Ehrbar 1976–2000 (from 1992 Lord Mayor)

=== Lord Mayor ===
- Wolfgang Ernst 2000–2016
- Hans D. Reinwald 2016–2024
- since 2024: John Ehret

== People, culture and architecture ==
Leimen consists of the Leimen (proper), nowadays called "Leimen (Mitte)", and the four boroughs Gauangelloch, Lingental, Ochsenbach and Sankt Ilgen.

Despite its industrial roots, Leimen's downtown has maintained a certain quaintness. It is an active town, with a regular cycle of festivals and activities.

At Ochsenbach, there is the NDB NKR.

== Notable people ==
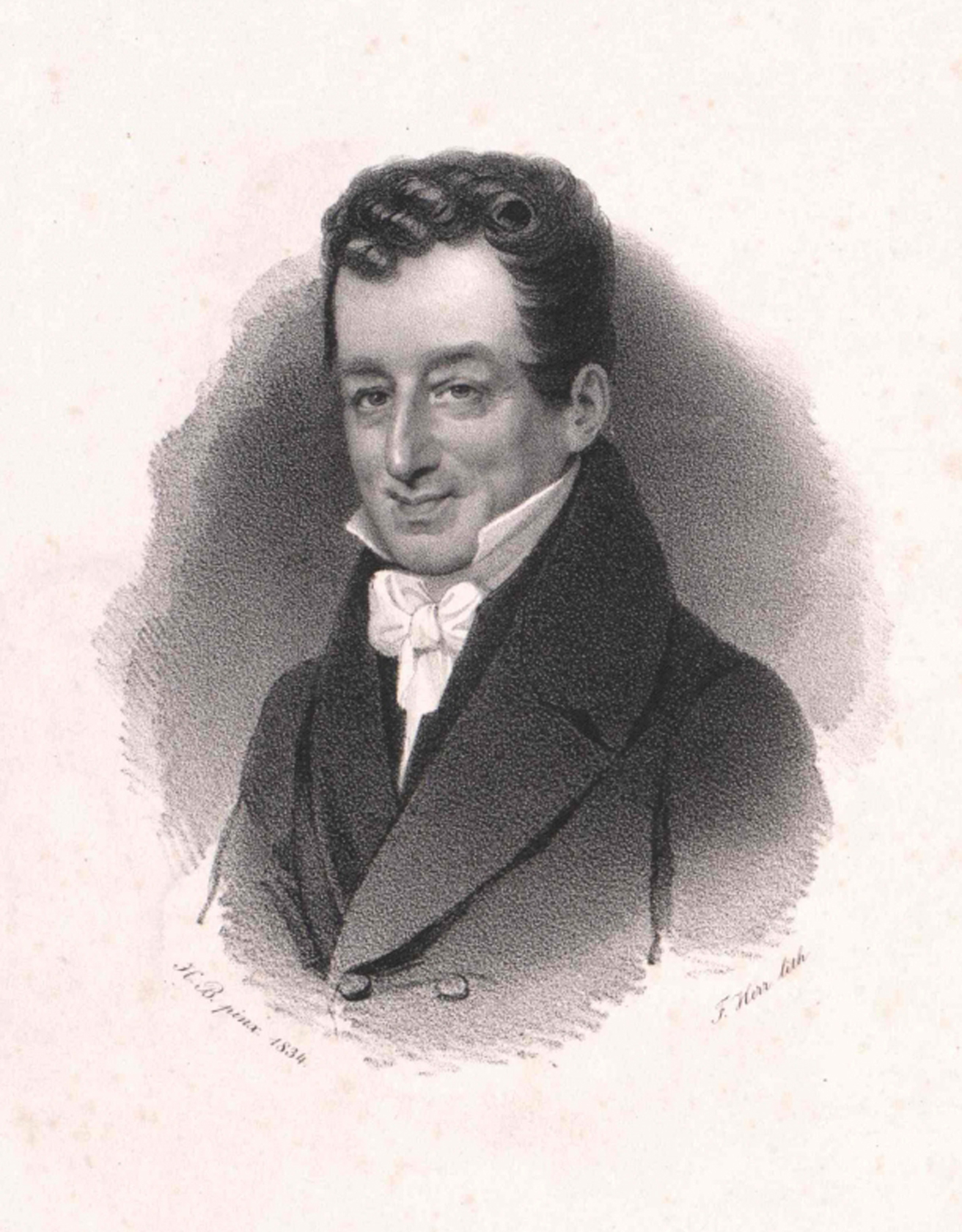
Joseph von Henikstein (around 1834)

- Joseph von Henikstein (1768–1838), businessman, patron of the arts and friend of Wolfgang Amadeus Mozart
- Anne Spiegel (born 1980), politician Alliance 90/The Greens, born in Leimen

=== Sport ===
- Michael Peter (1949–1997), field hockey player, died locally, team gold medallist at the 1972 Summer Olympics
- Rainer Zietsch (born 1964), footballer who played 339 games and coach
- Ralph Götz (born 1967), rugby player and administrator
- Boris Becker (born 1967), former world No. 1 tennis player
- Rainer Buhmann (born 1981), chess Grandmaster, 2007 and German Chess Champion, 2018
- Clemens von Grumbkow (born 1983), rugby union player
- Akeem Vargas (born 1990), basketball player, grew up in Leimen

== Twin towns – sister cities ==
Leimen is twinned with:

- Castanheira de Pera, Portugal
- Cernay-lès-Reims, France
- Kunín, Czech Republic
- Mafra, Portugal
- Tigy, France
- Tinqueux, France
