= Honig =

Honig is a surname of German, Dutch and Ashkenazi Jewish origin. The word means honey in German. People with the name include:

- Adriaan Honig or Honich (1643–1684), Dutch landscape painter
- Alice Sterling Honig (1929–2023), American child psychologist
- Antonín Honig, Czech cyclist who participated in the 1928 Olympics
- Barry H. Honig (born 1941), American professor of computational biochemistry and molecular biophysics
- Bonnie Honig (born 1959), American political and legal theorist and feminist
- Dick Honig (born c. 1940), American official in American football
- Donald Honig (born 1931), American writer, baseball historian
- Edwin Honig (1919–2011), American writer, translator
- Elie Honig, American attorney
- Eugen Honig (1873–1945), German architect
- Ezekiel Honig (born 1977), American musician, manager
- Helen Honig (1907–2003), American publisher
- Jan Honig (born 2012), German professional football player
- Joel Honig (1936–2003), American music critic, writer, pianist
- Lucy Honig (1948–2017), American short story writer
- Michael Honig (born 1955), American university professor in electronics
- Peregrine Honig (born 1976), American artist
- Philipp Honig (born 2007), German professional football coach
- Rachael A. Honig, American attorney
- Rebecca Honig a.k.a. Rebecca Handler (contemporary), American voice actress
- Reinier Honig (born 1983), Dutch racing cyclist
- Richard Honig (1890–1981), German professor for jurisprudence
- Sarah Honig (b. 1940s), Israeli-born journalist, author
- Sidonie Hönig (born 1871), Austrian actress
- Robertus Honig (born 1975), Dutch lawyer
- Sebastian F. Honig (born 1978), German astronomer
- Wolfgang Honig (born 1954), German athlete in rowing

== See also ==
- Hönig
