= Oberdöbling =

Oberdöbling (Central Bavarian: Obadöbling) was an independent municipality until 1892 and is today a part of Döbling, the 19th district of Vienna. It is also one of the 89 Katastralgemeinden.

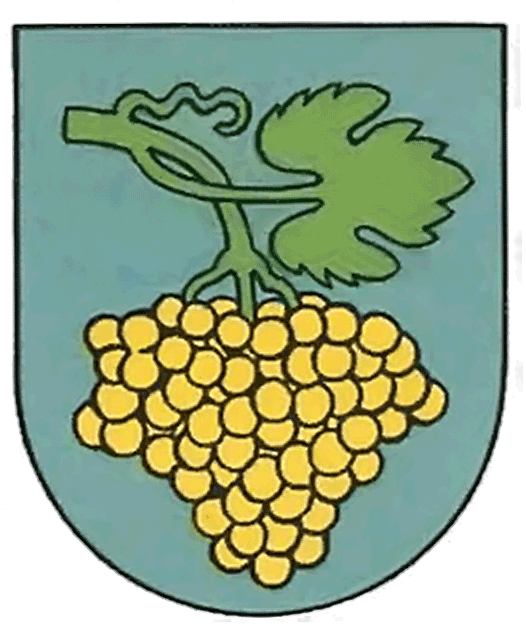
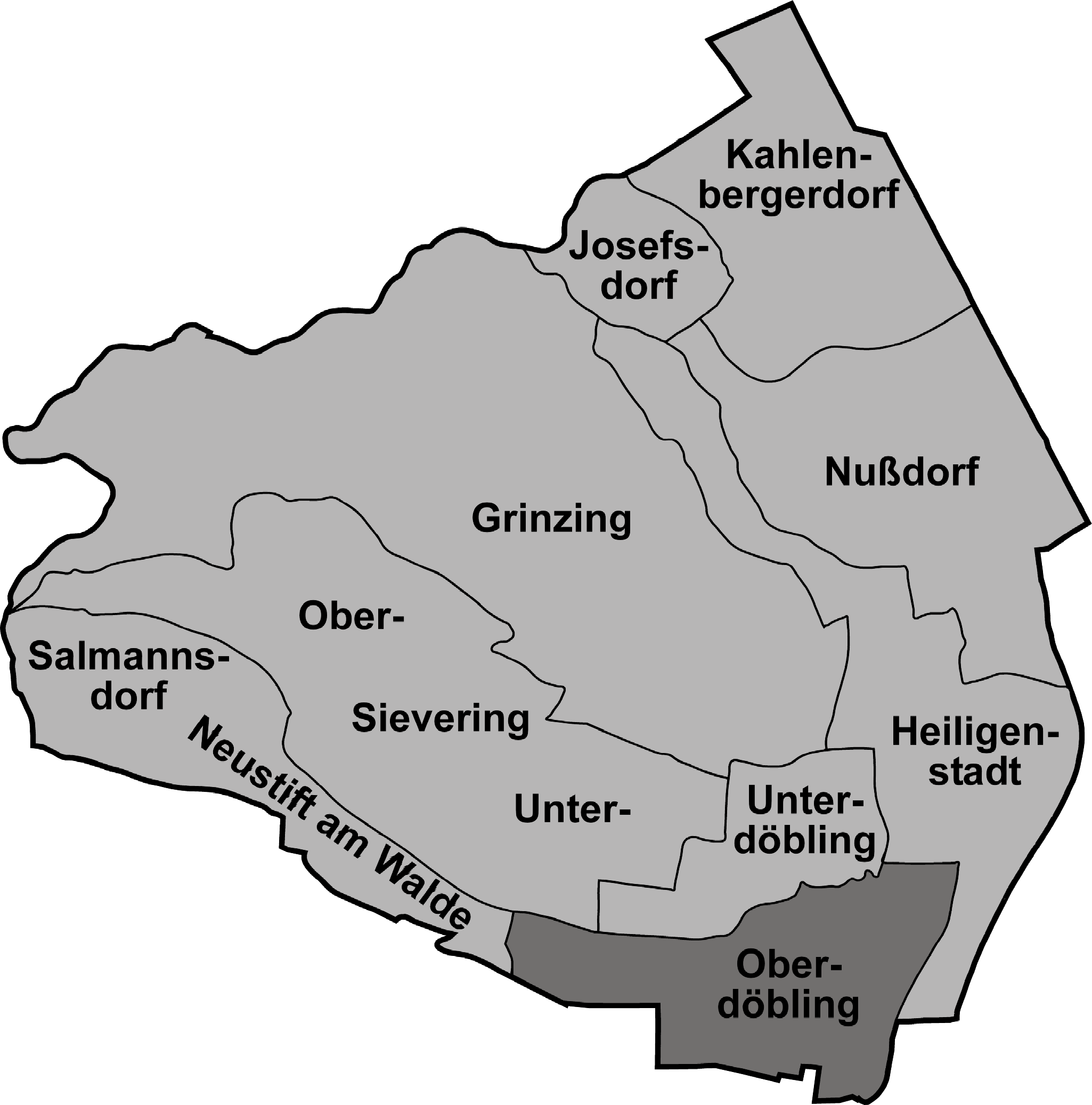
Oberdöbling
Coat of arms	Map
AUT Oberdöbling COA
Location: 48°14′28″N 16°21′18″E

== Geography ==
Oberdöbling lies in the south of the Döbling district of Vienna and covers an area of 241.20 hectares. In the north, Oberdöbling extends to the Krottenbach stream, thus bordering on Sievering and Unterdöbling. In the east, the Barawitzkagasse and Heiligenstädter Straße mark the border with Heiligenstadt, while the former Linienwall marks the border with Alsergrund. In the south, Oberdöbling borders on Währing and in the east on the section of the Katastralgemeinde also known as Währing that lies in Döbling. A settlement named Hart used to stand on the site of modern-day Oberdöbling, but it was abandoned in the 14th century. Oberdöbling developed along what is now the Hofzeile.

== History ==
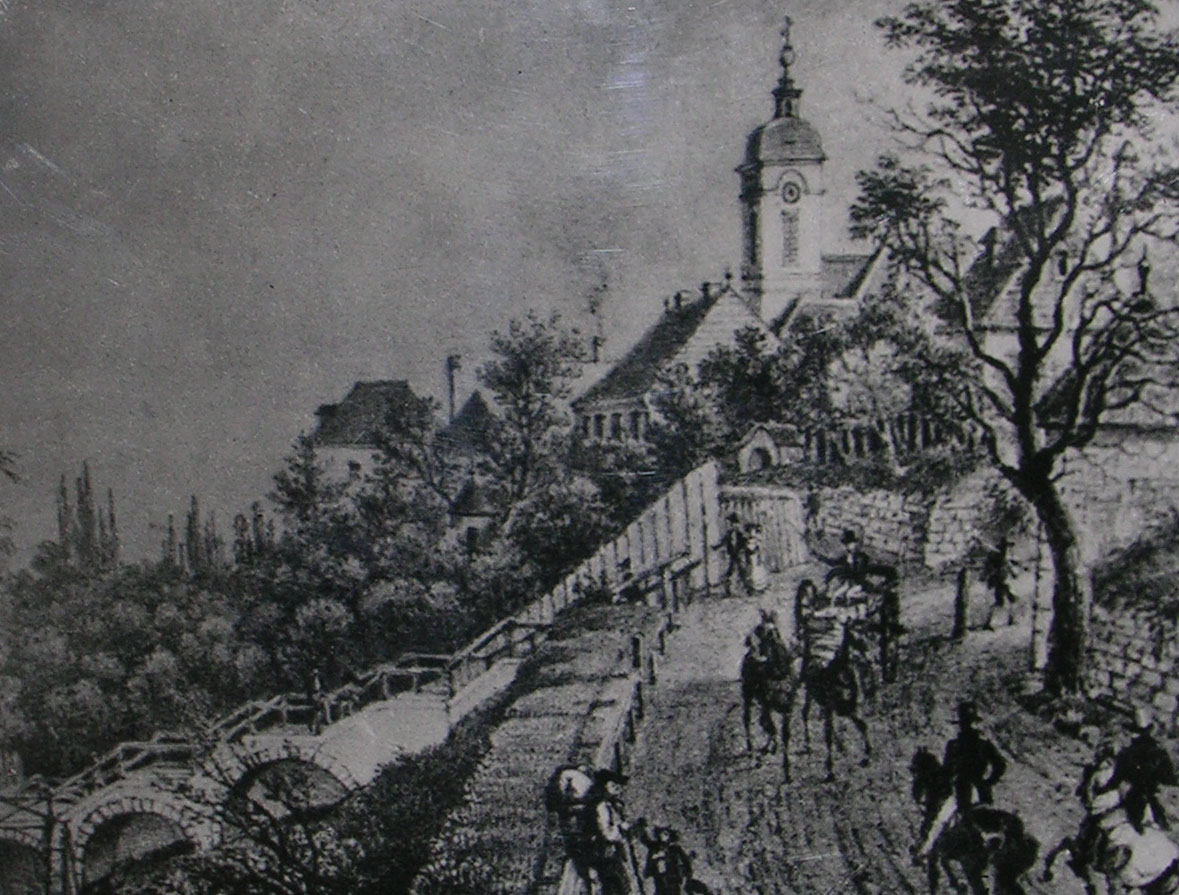
View of Oberdöbling in 1830 showing the parish church and a walkway over the Krottenbach

=== The origin of the name Döbling ===
Döbling is mentioned for the first time in an official document in 1114 as de Teopilic. This name is of Slavic origin; toplica either means “marshy water” and refers to the settlement’s location by the Krottenbach or derives from the Old Slavic term for a “warm creek”. Later usage includes spellings such as Toblich, Töbling and Tepling.

=== The creation of Unterdöbling and Oberdöbling ===
Döbling’s first residents were almost exclusively farmers, who were largely reliant on their own produce. They produced wine for sale, but also planted cereals for this purpose and produced fruit, vegetables and milk products. In the 12th century, the nobles derer von Topolic owned Döbling, later it was the property of the Dominican monastery in Tulln. It is mentioned in a document from 1310 as the village of the ladies of Tulln. As time progressed, separate villages evolved, divided from one another by the Krottenbach. Unterdöbling was originally known as Chrottendorf; the name Unterdöbling is believed not to have been in use until the 15th century. The separation of the two settlements was recorded in an official document for the first time in 1591.

=== Oberdöbling in the 17th and 18th centuries ===
A village seal dating from 1694 has been preserved. It depicts Saint James with the inscription Sigil der gemain Ober Döbling 1694 (Seal of the municipality Ober Döbling 1694). The village’s growth was arrested by the second siege of Vienna. In 1689, six years after the attack, just 50 of 850 vineyards were in use. The settlement took a long time to recover. At the start of the 18th century for example, Oberdöbling was still somewhat smaller than neighbouring Unterdöbling. When the plague hit in 1713 though, the village fared better than others. Of its 31 houses, just 5 were infected; 13 people died. In 1721, Oberdöbling consisted of three rows of houses – the Hofzeile (today the upper right-hand side of the Döblinger Hauptstraße), the Kirchenzeile (today the left-hand side of the Hofzeile), and the Bachzeile by the Krottenbach (today the right-hand side of the Hofzeile). There were 39 houses in total. The emperor’s use of the surrounding land as hunting grounds made Oberdöbling attractive both for the nobility and for members of Vienna’s bourgeoisie. Those who could afford to do so built second residences here. As in Hietzing, which profited from its proximity to the Schönbrunn Palace, this phenomenon created the basis for Oberdöbling’s privileged development. Five new streets were built in the village between 1765 and 1786. Today, these are the Döblinger Hauptstraße, the Heiligenstädter Straße, the Pyrkergasse, the Pokornygasse and the Billrothstraße. Later, the village gained its own suburb, which covered the Gymnasiumstrasse, the Hardtgasse and the Pyrkergasse. This Neu-Döbling (New Döbling) area was characterised by the wealth of its inhabitants, whereas construction in Alt-Döbling (Old Döbling) was patchy. There were still many run-down huts in parts of the old village.

=== Oberdöbling until its integration into the city of Vienna in 1892 ===
At the end of the 18th century, Oberdöbling grew rapidly. In 1780, there were 136 houses with a total of 932 inhabitants. Growth then slowed however, so that the number of houses only increased from 188 to 202 with a total of 1550 inhabitants between 1822 and 1835. The last lord of Oberdöbling was Anton Edler von Wirth, who had bought the land from the authorities responsible for administrating state property in 1824. He was also lord of Sievering.

Around the middle of the 19th century, a construction boom began in Oberdöbling. In 1853, there were 323 houses with a total of 4229 inhabitants; in 1890, there were 14,460 inhabitants in 567 houses. In 1858, gas-powered street lighting was introduced. The gas was supplied by an English firm based in the area between the Gymnasiumstraße and the Billrothstraße from 1856. In 1892, Oberdöbling, along with the surrounding suburbs of Grinzing, the Kahlenbergerdorf, Nußdorf, Heiligenstadt, Sievering and Josefsdorf, was turned into the 19th district of Vienna, Döbling.

== Economy ==
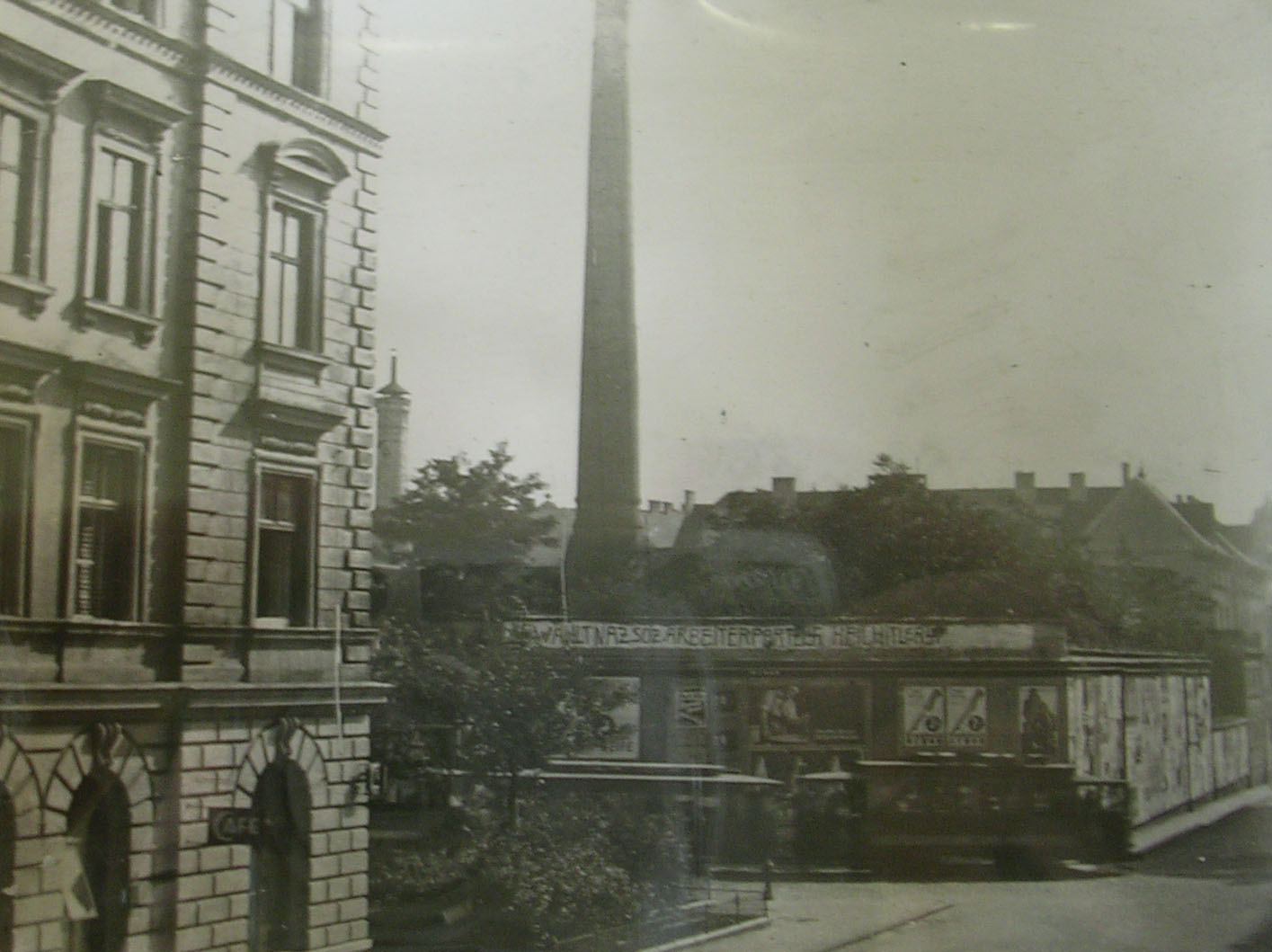
The Döbling brewery around 1930

In contrast to the situation in the surrounding villages, viticulture had already lost any significance in Oberdöbling’s economy at the start of the 19th century. Growing crops and fruit was already more profitable. Fields covered more than half of the available land; orchards took up a further 10 percent. In contrast, vineyards occupied approximately just seven percent of available land.

The first factory was built early in Oberdöbling. It was built in 1754, and produced velvet, silk, and fine fabrics. At first, it employed as many as 100 people; by 1790, there were already 300 people working in this factory. A hammer mill was built in 1783 at the point where the Arbesbach and the Krottenbach meet. The local brewery, which was founded to complement the brewery in Gaudenzdorf in 1833, and which was purchased by the owners of the Ottakringer Brauerei in 1856, was well known. After the brewery was destroyed in World War II, the Kopenhagenhof Gemeindebau was built in its stead. Other important enterprises established in the 19th century included the Vereinigte Tintenfabriken Hartmann und Mittler, later known as the Kuli-Werk, which existed between 1867 and 1968 and stood at number 8 in the Gatterburggasse. Kattus, a producer of sparkling wine, is today one of Döbling’s best-known enterprises.

== Culture ==
Oberdöbling’s first theatre opened in 1835 in the desacralised Johanneskapelle on the corner of the Döblinger Hauptstraße and the Hofzeile. In 1859, the actors relocated to the theatre restaurant “Wendl” at Währinger Spitz, which boasted both a summer arena and an indoor theatre, after their original home was sold to the nuns Schwestern vom armen Kinde Jesu. Rude comedies were popular; plays by Johann Nestroy were also produced. Alexander Girardi and Max Reinhardt both played here in their early years. The theatre was closed between 1881 and 1888 because of concerns over fire safety; in 1893 the entire restaurant folded.

Joseph Lanner and Johann Strauß the Elder held concerts in the “Finger” casino in Oberdöbling, but the “Finger” had to close in 1840, probably because of competition from the nearby casino “Zögernitz” (Döblinger Hauptstraße 76). The “Zögernitz”, which had been opened in 1837, became one of the most popular casinos in Vienna. Strauß and Lanner also performed here. In the 1960s, the building was converted into a hotel with a restaurant.

Nowadays, Oberdöbling is home to the most important local museum, the Bezirksmuseum Döbling, which is housed in the Villa Wertheimstein.

== Religion ==
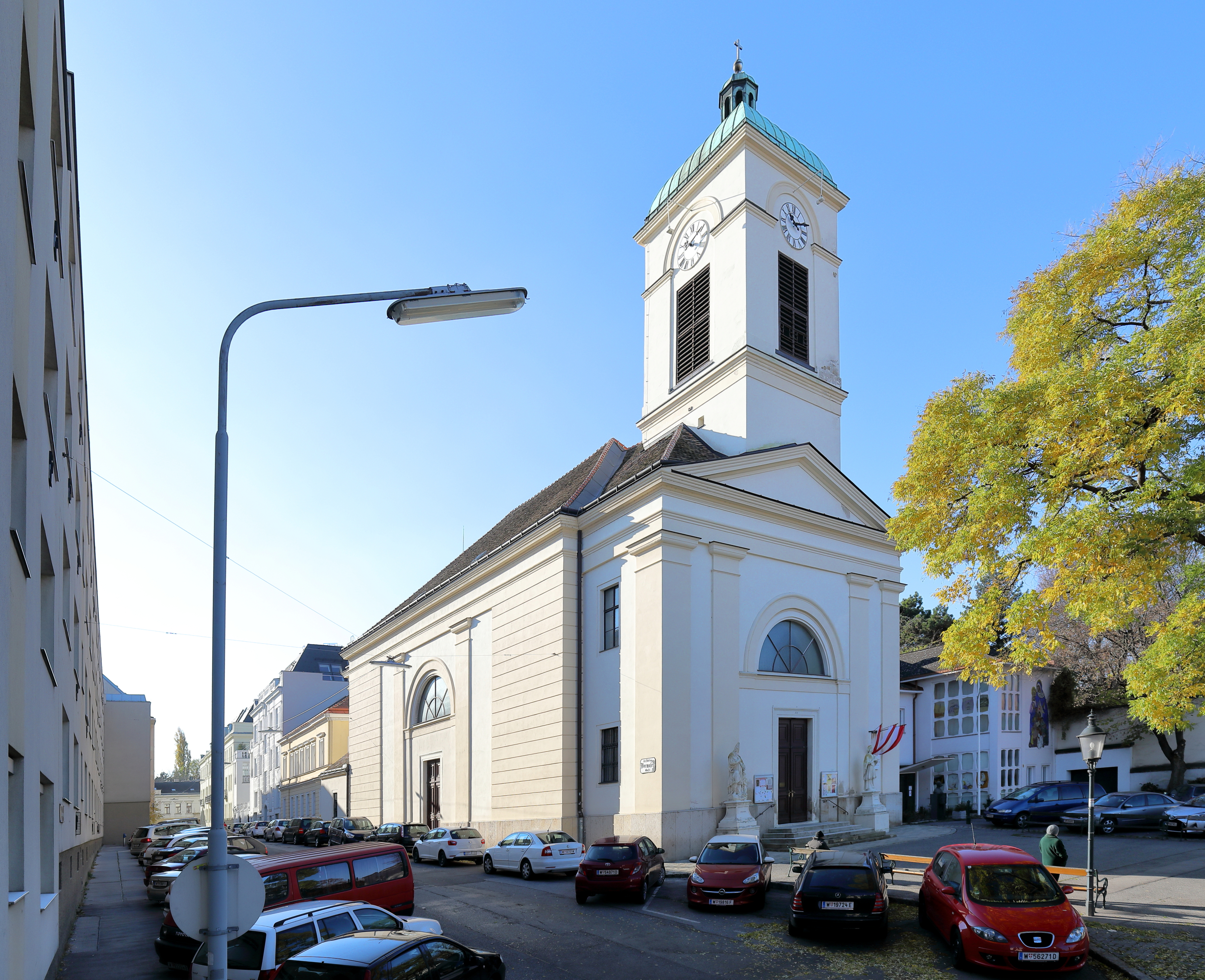
The parish church in Oberdöbling

=== History ===
A church is mentioned in Döbling for the first time in 1267, but the oldest still-standing church can only be traced back to the 15th century.

=== Church buildings ===
Oberdöbling falls within the Döbling parish, which belongs in turn to the 19th Vienna Deanery. Besides the Döbling Parish Church, Oberdöbling is also home to the nunnery of the Schwestern vom armen Kinde Jesu. This comprises educational institutions, a church and a chapel.

=== Cemeteries ===
The original Döblinger cemetery was in Unterdöbling. It was closed in 1927. It housed inter alia the graves of Johann Strauß the Elder and Joseph Lanner, whose remains were transferred to the city’s central cemetery. Their gravestones were both preserved in the Strauß-Lanner-Park that was created on the site after 1927. Other famous persons buried in the Döblinger cemetery were Nikolaus Lenau, Ludwig Boltzmann and Johann Nepomuk Berger, whose remains were transferred to other cemeteries. The new Döblinger cemetery was created in Oberdöbling, on the border to Glanzing and Währing. It is home to the graves of prominent local families such as Wertheimstein, Zacherl, Gräf and Kattus. Theodor Herzl, Wilhelm Miklas, Robert von Lieben and Ferdinand von Saar also found their last resting place here. Further to the south, on the border to Währing, there is also the last remnant of the Währinger cemetery, the abandoned Jewish cemetery.

== Education ==
Almost all grammar schools in Döbling are to be found in Oberdöbling. The GRG 19 and the GRW 19 are located in the Billrothstraße, the grammar school and business school of the Schwestern vom Armen Kinde Jesu are in the Hofzeile, the federal technical college Wien 19 is in the Krottenbachstraße, while the GRW 19 and the BG 19 are in the Gymnasiumstraße.

== Famous citizens ==
- Alfred von Henikstein (1810–1882), the highest-ranking Jewish officer in Austrian history
- Wilhelm August Rieder (1796–1880), Austrian painter
- August von Pelzeln (1825-1891), Austrian ornithologist

== Bibliography ==
- Christine Klusacek, Kurt Stimmer: Döbling. Vom Gürtel zu den Weinbergen. Wien 1988
- Karl Kothbauer: Döbling - und seine Ried- und Flurnamen. Dissertation Wien 2001
- Godehard Schwarz: Döbling. Zehn historische Spaziergänge durch Wiens 19. Bezirk. Wien 2004
