= Villa Wertheimstein =

House in Vienna, Austria

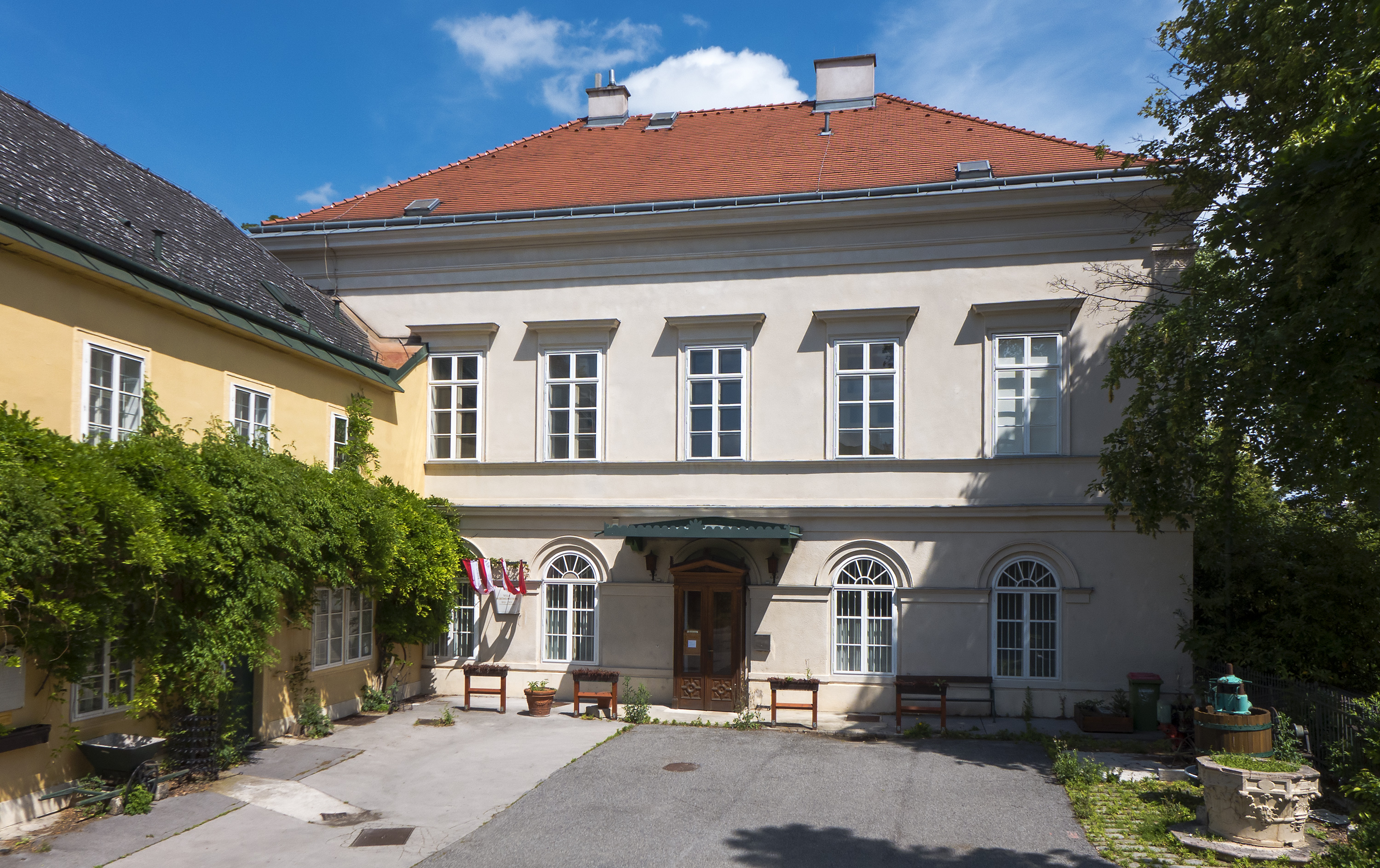
- Villa Wertheimstein
- Interactive map of the Villa Wertheimstein area

General information
- Architectural style: Biedermeier
- Location: Vienna, Austria, Döblinger Hauptstr. 96, 1190 Vienna
- Coordinates: 48.2431°N 16.3558°E

Villa Wertheimstein is a house in Vienna, Austria. It is part of the 19th borough Döbling. In this villa, Josephine von Wertheimstein and her daughter Franziska held their literary salons. The building now houses the Döbling Museum (Bezirksmuseum Döbling) next to the park which bears the name Wertheimstein Park.

== History ==
The industrialist Rudolf von Arthaber acquired the house in 1833, which had been the property of the Tullnerhof monastery. He transformed it in 1834 and 1835 in the Biedermeier style and installed his painting collection there. After Arthabers' death in 1867 and the auction of his collection, Leopold von Wertheimstein, banker for the Rothschild family, and his wife Josephine bought the house in 1870. This purchase was possible thanks to the emancipation of the Jews in Austria-Hungary in 1867. She opened her salon there where liberal personalities from Vienna gathered. Their daughter Franziska also participated. The poet Ferdinand von Saar, in love with Franziska, maintained an abundant correspondence with them over three decades. The salon was also frequented by Eduard von Bauernfeld and many other artists. Ferdinand von Saar died in the villa in 1906. In 1908, Franziska von Wertheimstein bequeathed the house and the park next to it to the city of Vienna.

== Gallery ==
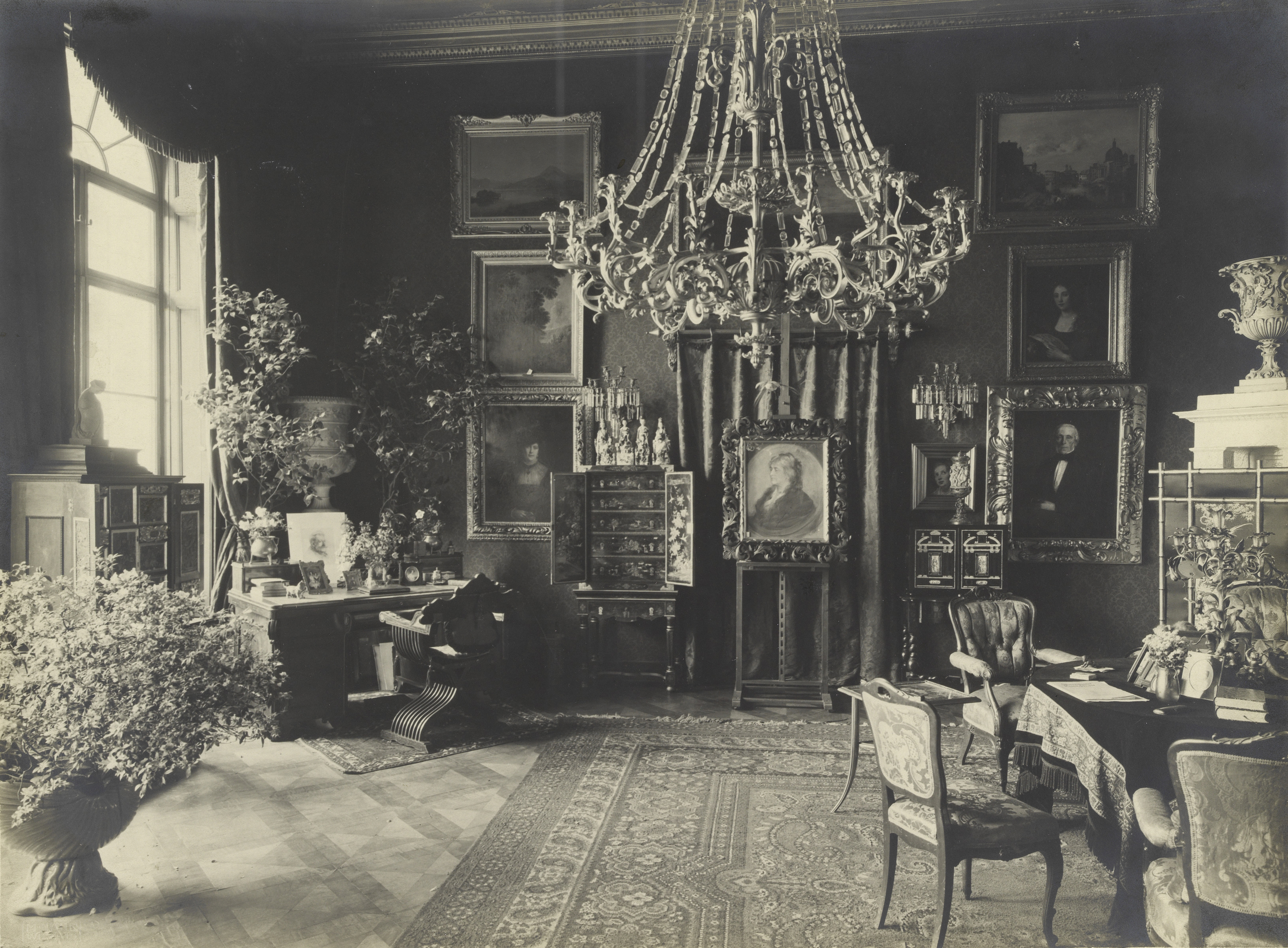
Interior view (1922)

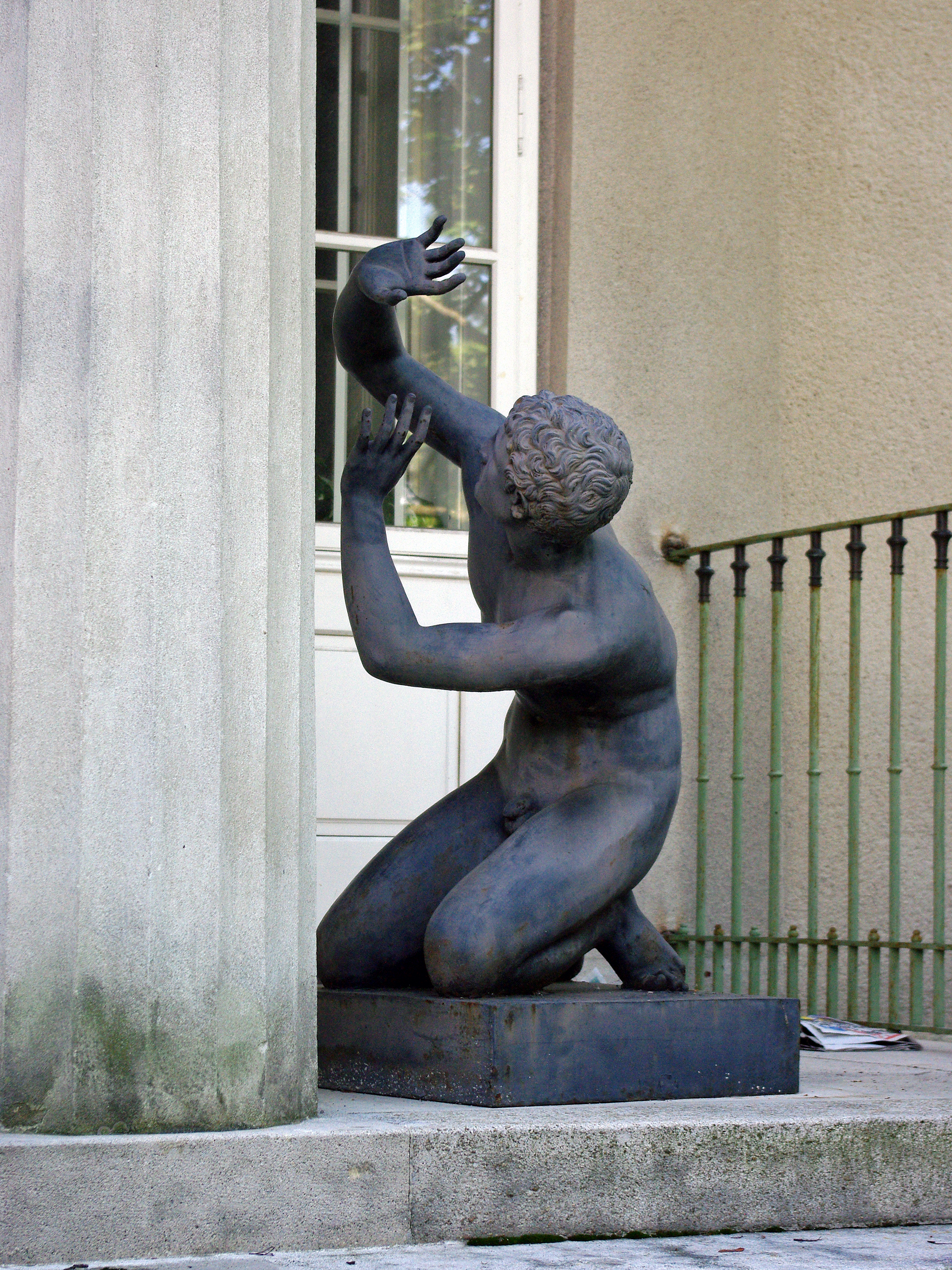
Sculpture at the back entrance

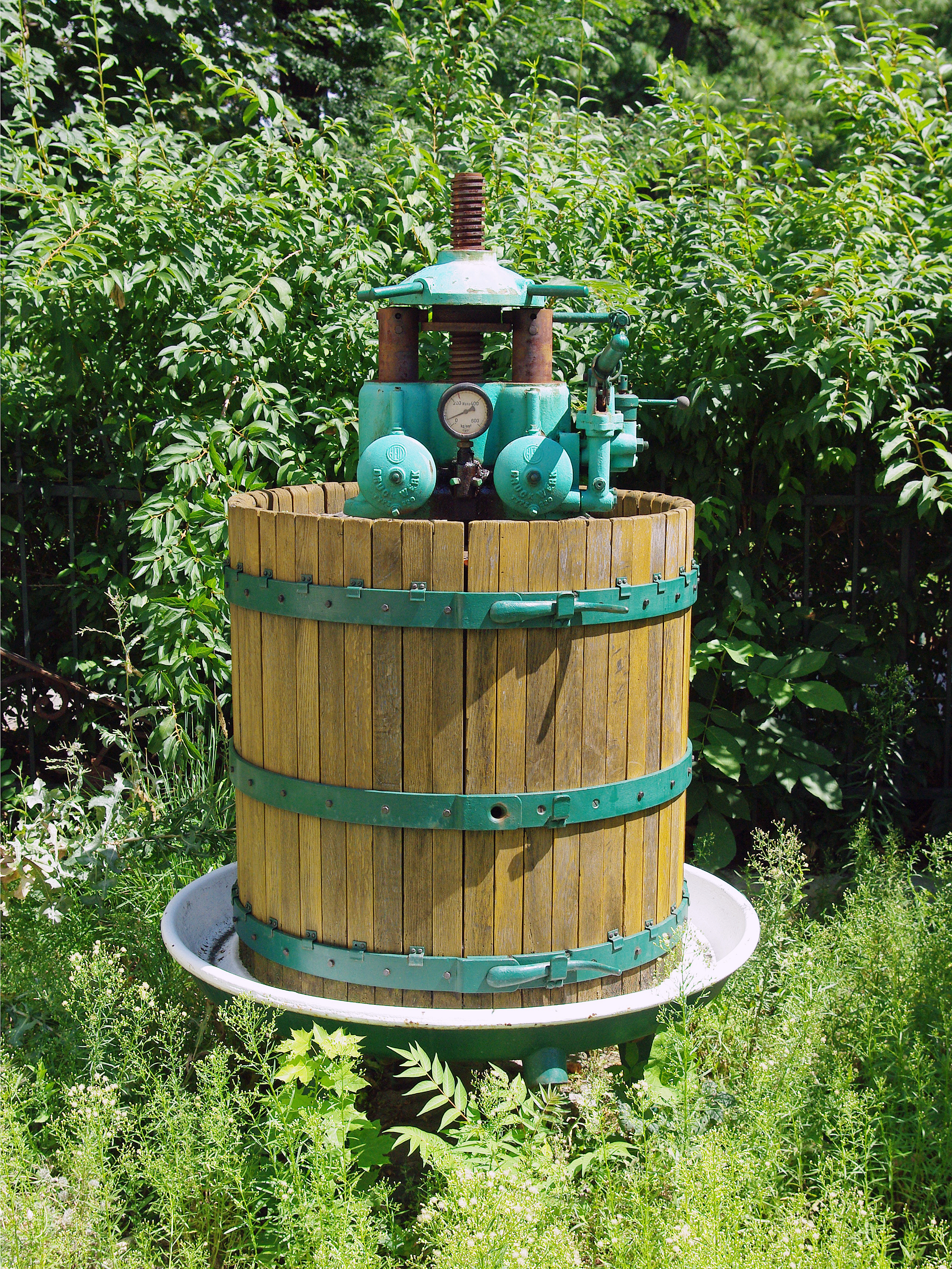
Wine press

== Literature ==
- Helmut Kretschmer: Wiener Bezirkskulturführer, XIX: Döbling. published by Jugend und Volk, Vienna 1982. ISBN 3714162356. (German)
