= Honigberg =

Honigberg may refer to:

Place name

- Hărman (Hungarian: Szászhermány), Saxon village in Braşov County, Romania

Family name

- Steven Honigberg (born 1962), American cellist
- Bronislaw M. Honigberg (1920–1992), American zoologist
