= Alfred von Henikstein =

Austrian Baron (1810–1882)

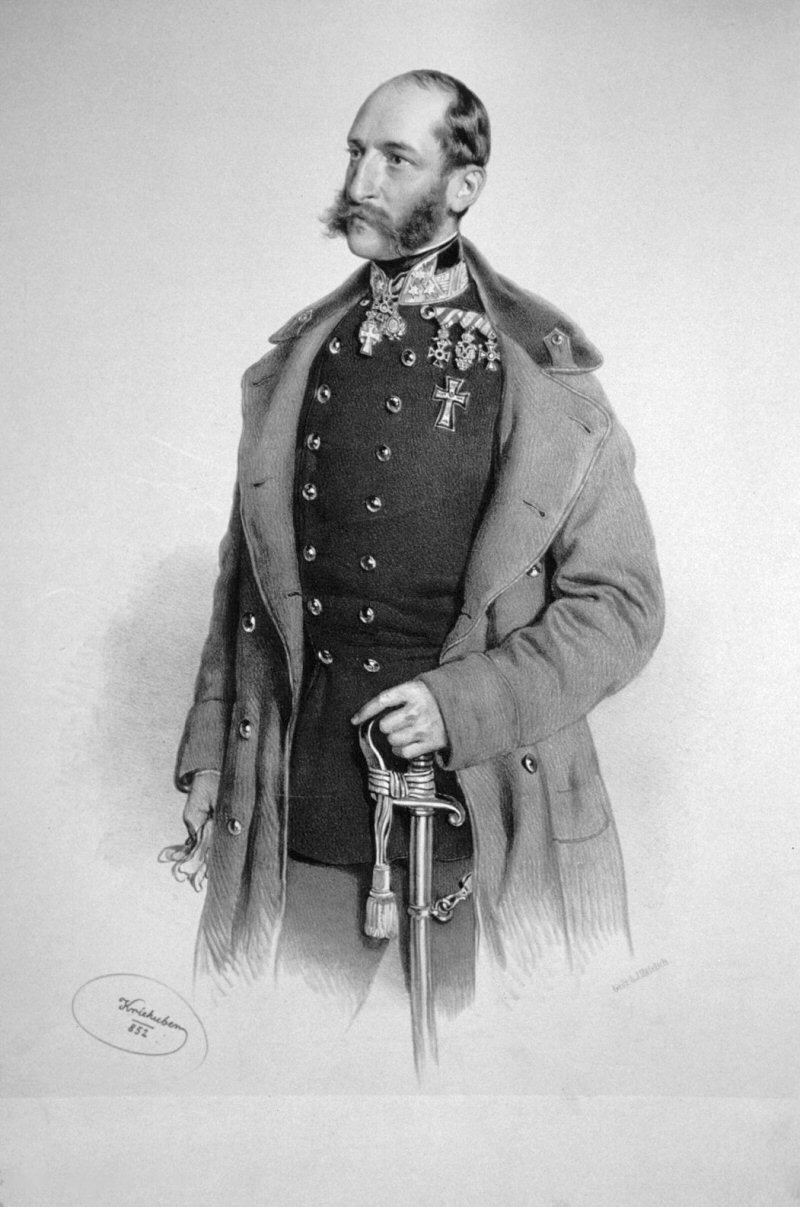
- Henikstein in 1852
- Born: 11 August 1810; Oberdöbling
- Died: 29 January 1882 (aged 71); Vienna
- Military career
- Allegiance: Austrian Empire
- Service years: 1827–1866
- Rank: Feldmarshall-Leutnant
- Conflicts: First Italian Independence War; Second Italian War of Independence; Austro-Prussian War

Alfred Freiherr von Henikstein (11 August 1810 – 29 January 1882) was the highest ranking Jewish officer in the Austrian army and chief of staff before and during the Austro-Prussian War.

Henikstein was born in Oberdöbling near Vienna, the youngest son of Ritter Joseph von Henikstein, a Jewish banker. He was baptized as a Roman Catholic as a child and in 1828 entered the Austrian engineering corps.

In 1829 he became a lieutenant, in 1832 a first lieutenant, and in 1842 a captain. In 1835 he married in Verona Santina von Scholl, daughter of the fortress architect Franz von Scholl, the "Austrian Vauban".

In 1848 he fought in Italy before Venice, participating in the construction of Fort San Pietro. He also took part in the Hungarian campaign and in the same year was promoted to major on the general staff, and in the following year to colonel. With the IV Corps he occupied Altona. In 1852 he lived in Venice, where his wife died in 1853. In 1854 he became major general, and in 1859 lieutenant general in Tyrol.

He became chief of staff in 1863. An efficient officer on the corps level, he was promoted above his qualification and in spite of his own initial rejection of the appointment.

In the Austro-Prussian War of 1866 his role as chief of staff was revoked the day before the battle of Königgrätz, although he participated in the battle. After the war he was court-martialed; the process was stopped by the Emperor, but Henikstein had to retire.

Alfred von Henikstein died on 29 January 1882 in Vienna.

== Bibliography ==
- Geoffrey Wawro, The Austro-Prussian War. Austria's war with Prussia and Italy in 1866 (New York 2007), ISBN 9780521629515
