= Sidonie Hönig =

Austrian actress

- Born: 1871; Vienna, Austria-Hungary
- Education: Vienna Conservatorium
- Occupation: Actress

Sidonie Hönig (born 1871) was an Austrian actress.

She made her début in 1889, at the Hoftheater in Carlsruhe, as Jane Eyre in Die Waise aus Lowood. In 1890 she went to the Deutsche Volkstheater in Vienna. Two years later she joined the Hamburg Stadttheater. In addition to Jane Eyre, her most successful roles include Desdemona, Rutland, and Philippine Welser.
