= Henig =

Henig may refer to:

== People ==
- Martin Henig, British archaeologist
- Michael Henig (born 1985), American football quarterback
- Ofira Henig (born 1960), Israeli theater director
- Robin Marantz Henig, American science writer
- Ruth Henig, Baroness Henig (1943–2024), British historian and politician
- Sheila Henig (1934–1979), Canadian pianist and soprano
- Stanley Henig (born 1939), British academic and politician

== Places ==
- Henig, a village in Berghin Commune, Alba County, Romania
- Henig, tributary of the river Secaș in Romania
