= Ferdinand von Saar =

Austrian novelist, playwright and poet (1833–1906)

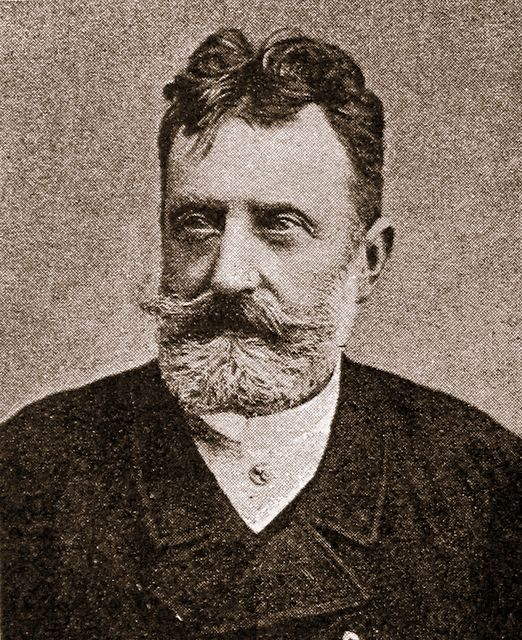
Ferdinand von Saar

Ferdinand Ludwig Adam von Saar (30 September 1833 in Vienna, Austria – 24 July 1906 in Döbling) was an Austrian novelist, playwright and poet.

Together with Marie von Ebner-Eschenbach he was one of the most important realistic writers in the German language of the late 19th century in Austria. His work was set to music by composer Pauline Volkstein.

== See also ==
- List of Austrian writers
