= Hönig =

Hönig or Hoenig is a German surname. Notable people with the surname include:

- Ari Hoenig (born 1973), American jazz drummer, composer, and educator
- Eugen Honig (1873–1945), German architect
- Franz-Josef Hönig (born 1942), German footballer
- Heinz Hoenig (born 1951), German actor
- Jonathan Hoenig (born 1975), American hedge fund manager
- Luis Fernando González Hoenig (born 1995), Mexican baseball player
- Michael Hoenig (born 1952), German composer
- Ron Hoenig, Australian barrister and politician
- Sebastian F. Hönig, astrophysict
- Thomas M. Hoenig (born 1946), American banker
- Wolfgang Hönig (born 1954), German rower

== See also ==
- 51983 Hönig, a main belt asteroid
- Hoenig v Isaacs
