= Rudolf Arapović =

Croatian writer and dissident

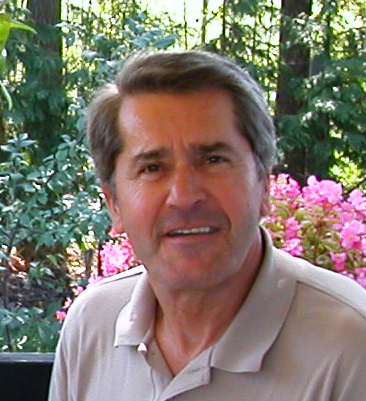
- Born: December 8, 1937; Busovača, Bosnia & Herzegovina
- Died: August 3, 2007, aged 69
- Resting place: Otruševac cemetery, Samobor

Rudolf Arapović (December 8, 1937 – August 3, 2007) was a Croatian writer and dissident who was born in the Central Bosnian town of Busovača and died near Samobor.

== Biography ==
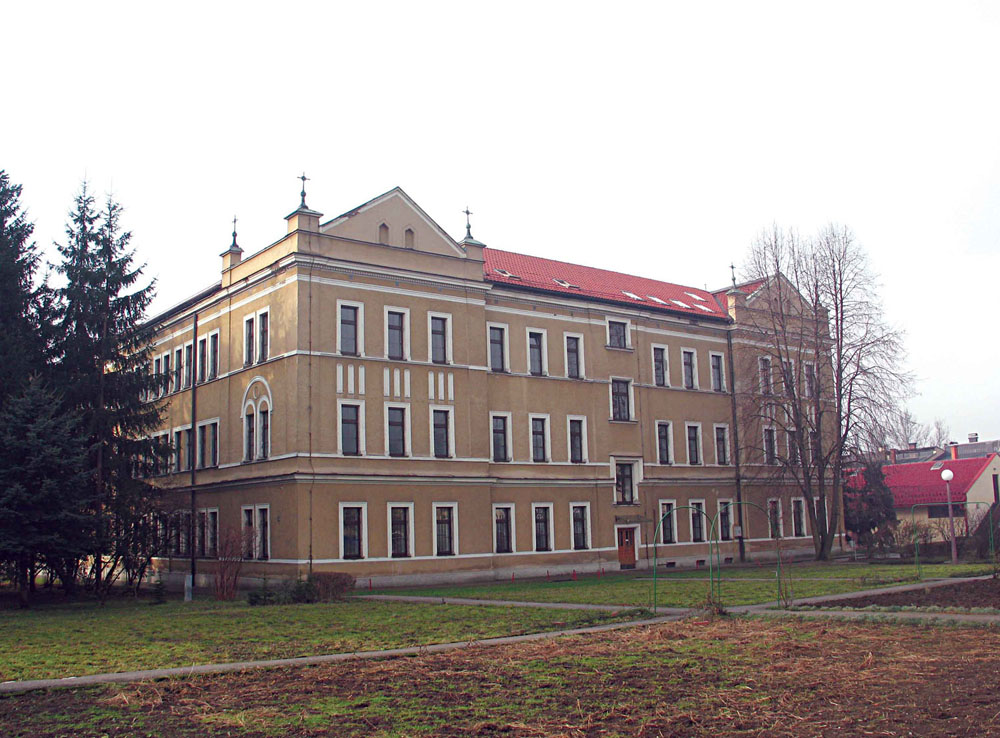
A photo of the Monastery of Saint-Bonaventure in Visoko

As a young child, he found himself in the Bleiburg Tragedy, with most of his family being persecuted by the Socialist regime of Yugoslavia. Due to his brother Pero being a part of the Crusaders, Rudolf and his family were interned to the city of Zavidovići where he would attend elementary school. In the city of Visoko, Rudolf Arapović would attend schooling at the Monastery of Saint-Bonaventure during the years 1955 to 1959, graduating and learning Latin in the process. It is noted that the UDBA (Yugoslav Secret Police) followed Rudolf during his schooling at Visoko. He would later attend and finish his secondary state schooling between the cities of Travnik and Zagreb. Rudolf would serve a 2-year military obligation in the Serbian cities of Ćuprija and Kragujevac, from 1961 to 1962, before studying Philosophy and German at the Faculty of Philosophy in Zagreb during the years 1962 to 1965.

Rudolf was arrested on June 7, 1965, with five other colleagues after anti-Yugoslav protests were held in the city of Zagreb. He was given a one-year sentence for reading the emigrant press to other colleagues. Roughly four months after being released from prison, Rudolf would escape Yugoslavia with his friend and fellow convict Bruno Bušić to Vienna, Austria. Rudolf would continue his studies in Vienna and participated in political work for Croatian emigrants, translating different Croatian publications into German and distributing writings to the press. During this time he would edit and publish The Bulletin of Croatian Socialists. The UDBA would follow him in Vienna, which led to Rudolf moving to Canada, working as a Tobacco Picker for four months.

He would then proceed to move from Canada back to Vienna before he decided to leave for the United States of America, going from New York City to Washington, D.C., on June 24, 1969, where 2 years later he would have a child. In the years 1974 to 1979, he would release different publications and newspapers from Washington, D.C., about the struggles of Croatia and Croatian emigrants abroad. In 1976, the 200th year of American independence, Rudolf together with friends of his distributed 5,000 leaflets which exposed many Americans to the atrocities committed by the Yugoslav Government. He used HB-Press for publishing and was mentioned on Narodne novine as well as collaborating with The Washington Post and The Washington Times. Rudolf would be an active parishioner of the Croatian Catholic Mission of St. Blaise in Washington, D.C., from its founding until he moved back to Croatia in 1997. In the year 2003 he would publish a book about his correspondence with Bruno Bušić called "Bruno Bušić, a meteoric flash on the Croatian horizon". In the same year, Rudolf would publish another book about the UDBA following his activities in the years 1964 to 1977 called "DL-22950, The secret correspondence of UDBA informants".

He would die at 7:10 am on August 3, 2007, at his home in nearby Savršćak to Cancer. His funeral was held at the Otruševac cemetery on August 6, 2007. Rudolf had donated over 10,000 Euros worth of books to the Church of Croatian Martyrs in Udbina before he passed. His funeral mass was held in nearby Domaslovec.

== Honours ==
- Order of Stjepan Radić 1997
