= Javorek =

Javorek may refer to:

== Places ==
- Javorek, Czech Republic, a municipality and village in the Vysočina Region
- Javorek, a village and part of Jilemnice in the Liberec Region, Czech Republic
- Javorek, Croatia, a village in Samobor

== People ==
- Javorek (surname)
