= Bregana =

- Naselje
- Location of Bregana in Croatia
- Coordinates: 45°50′18″N 15°41′17″E
- Country: Croatia
- County: Zagreb County
- Town: Samobor

Area
  - Naselje: 2.8 km^{2} (1.1 sq mi)
  - Metro: 5.60 km^{2} (2.16 sq mi)

Population (2021)
  - Naselje: 2,198
  - Density: 780/km^{2} (2,000/sq mi)
- Time zone: UTC+1 (CET)
  - Summer (DST): UTC+2 (CEST)
- Postal code: 10432
- Area code: +385-1
- License plates: ZG

Bregana (pronounced [brɛɡǎna]; German: Bergana) is a settlement (naselje) that is part of the town of Samobor, Zagreb County, Croatia. According to the 2001 census, the town has 2,518 residents living in an area of 2.81 square kilometers (1.08 sq mi). Together with the nearby settlements of Podvrh and Klokočevec Samoborski, the town's micropolitan area has 3,450 inhabitants.

Together with Macelj and Rupa, Bregana used to be the main Croatian border crossing with Slovenia, before Croatia joined Schengen in 2023. The checkpoint on the Slovenian side of the border was located in a small village called Obrežje. It is the start of the A3 highway which goes to Zagreb and on to Lipovac on the Serbian border in the east. The highway connects to Slovenia's A2 highway, which leads to Ljubljana. There was also a minor border crossing in the town itself, a two-lane road crossing between Bregana and Slovenska Vas. A railway crossing between the two countries used to be located in Harmica near Savski Marof in Brdovec municipality.

== Bibliography ==
=== Biology ===
- Šašić, Martina; Nahirnić, Ana; Tarmann, Gerhard M. (2016-12-31). "Zygaenidae (Lepidoptera) in the Lepidoptera collections of the Croatian Natural History Museum". Natura Croatica: Periodicum Musei Historiae Naturalis Croatici. 25 (2): 233–248. doi:10.20302/NC.2016.25.19. eISSN 1848-7386.
