= Gornja Vas =

Gornja vas may refer to several places:

In Austria:

- Oberdorf, Neuhaus, a settlement in the town of Neuhaus, known as Gornja vas in Slovene
- Oberdörfl, a village in the town of Sankt Margareten im Rosental, known as Gornja vas in Slovene

In Croatia

- Gornja Vas, Samobor, a settlement in the administrative territory of Samobor

In Slovenia:

- Gornja Vas, Zreče, a settlement in the Municipality of Zreče
- Gornja Vas, Šmarje pri Jelšah, a settlement in the Municipality of Šmarje pri Jelšah
- Gornja Vas, Zakojca, a hamlet of Zakojca in the Municipality of Cerkno
- Tenetiše, Litija, a settlement in the Municipality of Litija, formerly known as Gornja vas
