= Bobovica =

Bobovica may refer to:

- Bobovica, Bosnia and Herzegovina, a village near Trnovo
- Bobovica (river), right tributary of the Vrbanja river in Bosnia and Herzegovina
- Bobovica, Croatia, a village near Samobor
