= Veliki Lipovec =

Veliki Lipovec may refer to:

- Veliki Lipovec, Slovenia, a village near Žužemberk
- Veliki Lipovec, Croatia, a village near Samobor
