= Klake =

Klake may refer to:

- Klake, Kozje, a village in Slovenia
- Klake, Croatia, a village near Samobor
