= Molvice =

Molvice may refer to:

- Molvice, Zagreb County, a village near Samobor
- Molvice, Koprivnica-Križevci County, a village near Kalinovac
