= Order of Ante Starčević =

Order of Ante Starčević Red Ante Starčevića
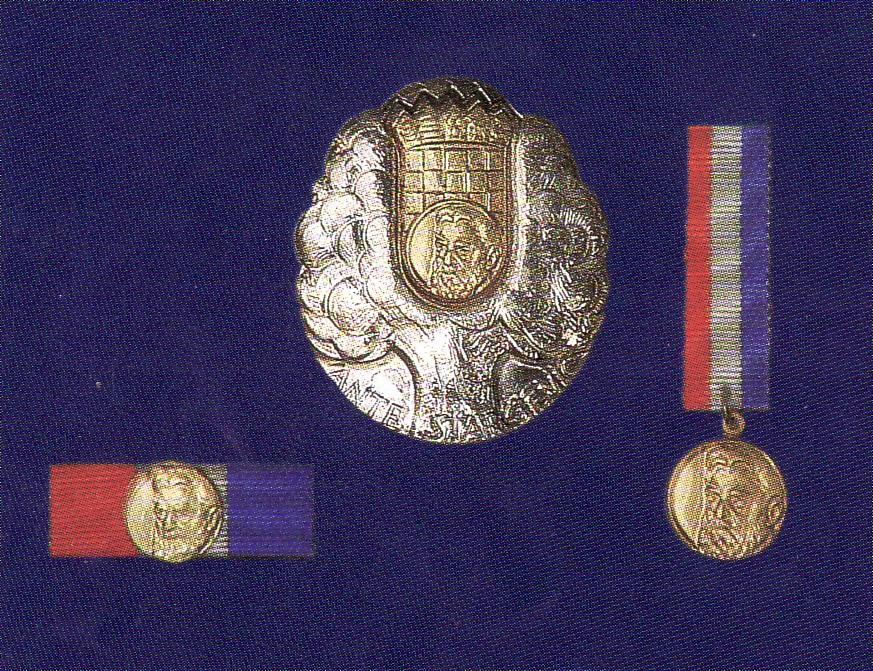
- Type: State order
- Awarded for: contributions to the development of the Croatian state
- Country: Republic of Croatia
- Presented by: the President of Croatia
- Eligibility: Croatian and foreign citizens
- Status: Active
- Established: 10 March 1995
- Ribbon of the Order of Ante Starčević

Precedence
- Next (higher): Order of Petar Zrinski and Fran Krsto Frankopan
- Next (lower): Order of Stjepan Radić

The Order of Ante Starčević (Croatian: Red Ante Starčevića) is a Croatian national decoration which ranks twelfth in importance. The order was formed on 10 March 1995.

The Order of Ante Starčević is granted to Croatians and foreigners for their contributions to the development of the Croatian state. It is named after Ante Starčević.

== Notable recipients ==
- Mate Boban
- Dalibor Brozović
- Bruno Bušić
- Ljubo Ćesić Rojs
- Šime Đodan
- Žarko Domljan
- Branimir Glavaš
- Ante Gotovina
- Hartmut Koschyk
- Ivan Lacković Croata
- Josip Lucić
- Ivić Pašalić
- Hrvoje Šarinić
- Christian Schmidt (awarded July 2013; received in person by Andrej Plenković in January 2020)
- Dario Kordić
- Vladimir Šeks
- Gojko Šušak
- Franjo Tuđman
- Nikica Valentić
- Ivan Vekić
- Vice Vukojević
- Muhamed Zulić

== Sources ==
- Law on Orders, Decorations and Signs of Recognitions of the Republic of Croatia ("Narodne novine", No. 20/95., 57/06. and 141/06.) - articles 6 and 16
- Statute on the Order of Ante Starčević ("Narodne novine", No. 108/00. from November 3, 2000).
