= Gojko Šušak =

Croatian politician (1945–1998)

Minister of Defence
- In office 18 September 1991 – 3 May 1998
- President: Franjo Tuđman
- Prime Minister: Franjo Gregurić; Hrvoje Šarinić; Nikica Valentić; Zlatko Mateša
- Preceded by: Luka Bebić
- Succeeded by: Andrija Hebrang

Personal details
- Born: 16 March 1945 Široki Brijeg, PR Bosnia and Herzegovina, FPR Yugoslavia (modern Bosnia and Herzegovina)
- Died: 3 May 1998 (aged 53) Zagreb, Croatia
- Resting place: Mirogoj Cemetery, Zagreb
- Party: Croatian Democratic Union
- Spouse: Đurđa Gojmerac
- Children: Katarina; Tomislav; Jelena
- Awards: Grand Order of King Dmitar Zvonimir Grand Order of King Petar Krešimir IV Order of Duke Domagoj Order of Nikola Šubić Zrinski Order of Ante Starčević Order of Stjepan Radić Order of the Croatian Trefoil Homeland's Gratitude Medal

Military service
- Allegiance: Croatia
- Branch/service: Armed Forces of Croatia
- Years of service: 1991–1998
- Rank: General of the Army
- Commands: Croatian Defence Minister
- Battles/wars: Croatian War of Independence, Bosnian War

Gojko Šušak (Croatian pronunciation: [gȏːjko ʃûʃak]; 16 March 1945 – 3 May 1998) was a Bosnian-Croat politician who held the post of Minister of Defence from 1991 to 1998 under President Franjo Tuđman. From 1990 to 1991 he was the Minister of Emigration and was the Deputy Minister of Defence in 1991.

Born in Široki Brijeg, Bosnia and Herzegovina, he attended the University of Rijeka in 1963. In 1969 Šušak emigrated to Canada where he worked in the restaurant and construction business and rose to prominence within the Croatian diaspora in North America in the following decades. In the late 1980s he became a close friend and associate to Franjo Tuđman, leader of the Croatian Democratic Union (HDZ) party seeking Croatia's independence from Yugoslavia.

In 1990, he returned to Croatia. After Tuđman became president following the 1990 parliamentary election, Šušak was named Minister of Emigration and helped gather economic aid from Croatian emigrants. From early 1991 he was the Deputy Minister of Defence. In September 1991 he was appointed Minister of Defence, an office he held throughout the Croatian War of Independence. As minister, Šušak reorganized and modernized the Croatian Army, leading it to a status of a regional power. He contributed to the planning of key military operations, particularly Operation Storm in 1995 that effectively ended the war in Croatia. He supported the Croatian Republic of Herzeg-Bosnia during the 1992–94 Croat–Bosniak War and later helped broker the 1995 Dayton Agreement. During his term in office he forged close contacts with the United States Department of Defense. Šušak's tenure as Defence Minister is the longest in Croatian history and lasted until his death in 1998.

== Early life ==
Šušak was born on 16 March 1945 in Široki Brijeg, in present-day Bosnia and Herzegovina. He was the sixth child of Ante and Stana Šušak. Both his father and brother disappeared at the end of World War II. Both of them fought in the NDH Armed Forces and were last seen in Zagreb after the Yugoslav Army entered the city. Šušak finished elementary school and high school in Široki Brijeg. In 1963 he moved to Rijeka where he studied Physics and Mathematics at the teacher's college of the University of Rijeka.

== Emigration to Canada ==
Šušak left Yugoslavia on 15 August 1968 and moved to Frohnleiten in Austria, where he lived for six months. Then he emigrated to Canada and studied Business and Administration at the Algonquin College in Ottawa. From 1969 to 1972 he was a manager at the Scott's Chicken Villa chain of restaurants. In 1972, he engaged in private business and founded his own small business, Susak Enterprises Ltd and GG Decor and Interior Design. He ran a successful chain of pizza restaurants. In 1973, he married another Croatian migrant, Đurđa Gojmerac, a social worker. They had two daughters, Katarina and Jelena, and a son, Tomislav, and lived in Ottawa.

He was associated with Croatian Franciscans in Canada, especially with their mission in Norval that helped gather Croats in North America. Šušak was one of the most active Croat migrants in Canada and soon he became a prominent figure among Croatian Canadians. He was involved with organizing Croat schools, football clubs and church events. He established the Croatian Studies Foundation and the Croatian-Canadian Cultural Federation. From 1985 Šušak was the director of the Croatian School in Ottawa. He assisted in opening the Croatian studies chair at the University of Waterloo in 1988.

In 1987, Croatian dissident Franjo Tuđman made his first visit to Canadian Croat communities. There he met Šušak, who organized his first lecture. Tuđman later founded the Croatian Democratic Union (HDZ) in 1989. Šušak, an ardent anti-communist and supporter of Croatia's independence from Yugoslavia, helped Tuđman and raised money for his campaign. He soon became one of Tuđman's closest associates.

== Return to Yugoslavia ==
In January 1990 Šušak returned to Yugoslavia and attended the 1st Convention of the HDZ held in Zagreb. Following the first parliamentary election held in May 1990, Šušak was named the Minister of Emigration on 30 May. In his mandate Šušak mostly traveled abroad with the task of connecting with Croatian diaspora and strengthening diplomatic and economic ties with countries where Croat emigrants lived in significant numbers. Šušak was considered the leader of the so-called Herzegovina lobby, that allegedly secured several top positions within the HDZ government. Šušak was "adept at tapping the purses of the tight-knit Herzegovinian community in the Americas, delivering millions of dollars worth of contributions to Tuđman's campaign." He played a vital role in funding the HDZ and provided the party a critical advantage over the political opposition.

From 4 March 1991 he was the Deputy Minister of Defence. On 31 March the Croatian War of Independence began between Croatia and the rebel SAO Krajina, supported by the Yugoslav People's Army (JNA). There were allegations that Šušak was in a group that had fired Armbrust anti-tank missiles on civilian houses in mostly Serb populated Borovo Selo in April 1991, prior to the Battle of Borovo Selo. On 25 June 1991, Croatia and Slovenia declared independence from Yugoslavia.

As a member of the government, Šušak helped gather economic aid from wealthy emigrees in order to buy weapons. In an interview he gave in September 1991, he estimated that about 5,000 small arms used by Croatian forces were bought with emigre money. On 18 September 1991 Šušak was named minister of defence, a day after Luka Bebić resigned from that position and four days after the Battle of the Barracks began. Ivan Milas was named his deputy.

== Minister of Defence ==
=== Croatian War of Independence ===
At the time Šušak was named minister, Croatia was faced with intense clashes across the country, especially in eastern Croatia. The JNA offensive was concentrated at Vinkovci and Vukovar, which Šušak compared with the Battle of Stalingrad and said that "the 4 1/2 million Croatian people, with such will, can never be defeated by any armor". The Defence Ministry engaged most of available weaponry on the eastern front and in the Battle of Vukovar. Around 50-60% of ammunition was used in the area of Vukovar, which the JNA forces captured on 18 November. In July 1991, the Croatian National Guard (ZNG), later renamed to Croatian Army (HV), had only three to four brigades, but relatively numerous police forces. With the naming of general Anton Tus as Chieff of Staff of the HV and the restructuring carried out by Šušak, by early December 60 brigades of the ZNG were formed. On 25 September the United Nations imposed a weapons embargo. The Croatian government continued to buy weapons, but also started producing its own mortars, machine guns, and tanks.

The JNA seized control of about a quarter of Croatia's territory by the end of 1991, which were declared part of Republic of Serbian Krajina (RSK). On 2 January 1992 Šušak and JNA General Andrija Rašeta signed a ceasefire in Sarajevo that went into effect on the following day. Šušak used that time to amass weapons and build up the armed forces. He also focused on closer links with the United States.

In early 1992 the war spread to neighboring Bosnia and Herzegovina, where the Croatian government helped arm the Croatian Defence Council (HVO), the main Croat army, and the Bosniak Army of the Republic of Bosnia and Herzegovina (ARBiH). The Defence Ministry established logistics centers for sending men, weapons and ammunition to the ARBiH. HV units were deployed in Bosnian Posavina and participated in Operation Jackal against the VRS. On 18 November 1991 the Croatian Community of Herzeg-Bosnia was established as an autonomous Croat territorial unit. Šušak was one of the chief supporters of Herzeg-Bosnia in the government and according to historian Marko Attila Hoare acted as a "conduit" of Croatian support for Bosnian Croat separatism. Relations between Croats and Bosniaks worsened by the end of 1992, resulting in the Croat–Bosniak War. During the war, HV units were deployed on the frontlines against the VRS in eastern Herzegovina. Volunteers with origins from Herzeg-Bosnia were sent by the Defence Ministry to the HVO, the official military formation of Herzeg-Bosnia. At its peak the amount of money from Croatia that funded the HVO surpassed $500,000 per day. Šušak supported the Vance-Owen plan that would establish 10 ethnically based provinces in Bosnia and Herzegovina. He worked closely with EC representative David Owen, who adopted some of his proposals. On 18 March 1994 the US-brokered Washington Agreement was signed that ended the Croat–Bosniak conflict and created the Croat-Bosniak Federation.

Šušak was not inclined to officers or politicians that used to be close to the Communist Party or the JNA. In 1994 a group of HDZ officials, including future president of Croatia Stjepan Mesić, left the party due to policy issues on which Mesić and Manolić were criticized within the HDZ. Mesić said that Šušak did not like him because he held the view that Croatia was created thanks to the anti-fascist struggle during World War II.

=== Relations with the US Department of Defense ===
The Bush administration adopted a neutral position in dealing with the wars in Slovenia, Croatia, and Bosnia and Herzegovina, leaving the European Union to deal with the crisis. The US policy in the region changed significantly after the election of Bill Clinton as president. The Clinton administration took a tougher stance against Slobodan Milošević. Šušak stated after the war that "the US policy in 1991 and today is like heaven and earth. Today we are partners, and at the beginning we were someone who shook the order that somehow suited them".

The US Government started working closely with the Croatian Government in spring 1994. Šušak became the main person of the Croatian diplomacy towards the US and the Ministry of Defence was perceived as the key one in Croatian–American relations. He was respected by military circles in Pentagon, especially by US Secretary of Defense William Perry, who considered him "a man of his word".

Šušak asked Perry for military aid in March 1994, but as the UN arms embargo was still in effect, the US Government referred Šušak to the Military Professional Resources Inc. (MPRI), a private military contractor. The MRPI's retired US officers provided technical assistance to Croatian officers. On 29 November 1994, a Croatian delegation led by Šušak met in Pentagon with US representatives, including Secretary Perry and General Wesley Clark. A military cooperation between the US and Croatia was signed and talks were held regarding the situation in the region, especially the Bihać area. Šušak said that Croatia doesn't need military assistance, but asked for understanding if Croatia had to act in order to protect its borders.

In February 1995, Šušak visited Washington and expressed the intention for a military takeover of the occupied territory. He was told that a military offensive would be a big challenge and that the US couldn't provide assistance. At a meeting in Munich, Holbrooke and Perry told Šušak that the Croatian Army lacked the strength to defeat the RSK forces. The US supported the Croatian assistance in defending Bihać, but the Clinton administration was divided over what stance to take in case of an offensive on the RSK.

=== Reorganization of the Army ===
The Defence Ministry had an ambitious plan about the modernization, reorganization, and arming of the Croatian Armed Forces. Around one billion dollars were spent on small arms and heavy weapons, mostly bought from former countries of the Warsaw Pact. The MPRI assisted in the training of Croatian officers. As early as October 1994, Šušak implemented a new education program for commissioned and noncommissioned officers, based on NATO practices.

The main command of the army was the HV General Staff and under it were six corps districts (zborno područje, in Zagreb, Split, Gospić, Osijek, Karlovac, and Bjelovar) and one war theatre, as well as the Croatian Navy and the Croatian Air Force and Air Defence. Corps districts usually included a motorized Guards brigade, 3-6 infantry brigades, 3-6 Home Guard regiments, a logistic base, artillery support battalions, anti-armor and air defence units, and a number of smaller units. They also included reserve units. There were seven Guards brigades which were the main forces of the Croatian Army. The reserve units included 28 infantry brigades and 38 Home Guard regiments. The 1st Croatian Guards Corps, formed in 1994, was directly subordinated to the Ministry of Defence.

By the end of 1994 the reorganization of the Croatian Army was completed. It numbered 96,000 men and had 320 artillery pieces of 105 to 203 mm. The Croatian Air Force had 40 aircraft and 22 helicopters, while the Navy had 28 vessels. In 1995, the Army was organized into eight brigades and had a total of 140,000 Home Guardsmen. The Ministry of Defence had a budget of $5.6 billion. The defence budget reached its peak in 1995 when it accounted to 11.38% of the GDP, up from about 5% in 1991, and was more than 35% of the national budget. The Croatian Army became a regional power.

=== Final offensives ===
Gojko Šušak (third from the left, first row) and President Franjo Tuđman (to his right), among other high-ranking officials, observing the progress of Operation Storm on 4 August 1995

In late November an VSK-VRS offensive continued on Bihać. Had the Bihać pocket fallen, the RSK and Republika Srpska would be physically merged, which would have made the position of Croatia much more difficult. For this reason, Šušak organized a meeting of the HV and HVO commanders to arrange a wider operation in the area. On 2 December Šušak said that "Croatia will not wait for the fall of Bihać". A few days earlier Šušak ordered the HV-HVO Operation Winter '94 in southwestern Bosnia, commanded by Tihomir Blaškić, Janko Bobetko, and Ante Gotovina.

President Tuđman planned a military offensive against the RSK for a long time. In January 1995 he called for ending the mandate of UNPROFOR in Croatia, but temporarily postponed any actions. For the ensuing military offensives the number of troops increased through additional mobilization and mobilization of reserves. On 1 May an operation codenamed Operation Flash was conducted by the Croatian Army in western Slavonia. More than 7,000 soldiers were involved in the offensive that lasted 36 hours and resulted in a Croatian victory. 558 km^{2} (215 sq mi) of RSK held territory was regained. The HV at the time had 393 armored vehicles, of which 232 were tanks.

In July Šušak made another trip to Washington and again expressed the idea of a military attack on the RSK. On 11 July the Army of Republika Srpska captured Srebrenica. By the end of the month fighting in the Bihać pocket escalated. Tuđman signed with Izetbegović the Split Agreement on mutual defence. The joint HV and HVO forces started the Operation Summer '95 in western Bosnia and isolated Knin from Republika Srpska.

Then the Croatian leadership decided to mount an all-out attack on the RSK. A meeting of the Croatian military and political leadership was held on the Brijuni Islands on 31 July 1995, where details of the upcoming Operation Storm were discussed. They estimated that a victory could be achieved within four to eight days. The Pentagon thought that such an assertion was too optimistic. On the morning of 4 August, an offensive was launched on a 630-kilometre front. On the second day of the offensive the 7th Guards Brigade entered Knin with minimal casualties. One day later Tuđman visited Knin together with Šušak and other members of the government. The operation ended on 8 August. It effectively dissolved the RSK, leaving only eastern Slavonia outside Croatian control, and changed the balance of power in the region.

At a press conference held after the operation ended, Šušak said: "Following the fall of Srebrenica and Žepa, we could no longer afford to wait and see something similar happening in Bihać. We spent several days in preparation; we submitted a report to the supreme commander which said we were capable of doing it, and he made the decision and signed the order."

An offensive codenamed Operation Mistral 2 against the VRS in western and northern Bosnia followed in September. Croat forces pressed towards Banja Luka, the capital of Republika Srpska. Some US representatives, including Galbraith, Clark, and Holbrooke, advised Šušak to take as much territory from Republika Srpska as they could, but with the exception of Banja Luka. In October, the HV-HVO force came within 16 miles south of Banja Luka. The Serb leadership was forced to start peace negotiations or risk the capture of its capital. The negotiations produced the Dayton Agreement, where Šušak was one of the key Croatian negotiators in Dayton. He also worked on an agreement regarding the peaceful reintegration of eastern Slavonia to Croatia.

=== Post-war period ===
In his January 1996 address to the Parliament, Tuđman declared the shift from a wartime to a peacetime army, a more economical use of national resources by the Defence Ministry, and the beginning of the accession process of Croatia to the Partnership for Peace and NATO. The defence budget was cut down in the first post-war year to slightly less than 25% of the national budget. Professional cadre was to be the backbone of the post-war Croatian armed forces and the Defence Ministry continued to receive assistance from the MPRI. A new organizational structure was introduced in December 1997.

In February 1996, Šušak criticized the Bosniak military commanders for uncontrolled arms buildup, which he described as a threat to the Dayton peace agreement. In January 1997, the International Criminal Tribunal for the former Yugoslavia (ICTY) contemplated subpoenaing Šušak. The ICTY requested the defence minister to deliver a complete archive of the Armed Forces and all documents related to the communications of the Ministry of Defence and the HVO in the period from April 1992 to January 1994. The subpoenaing became the subject of a legal dispute between the Prosecutor's Office and Croatia. Šušak was represented by future president of Croatia Ivo Josipović at these proceedings. At the 4th General Convention of the HDZ, held in February 1998, Šušak was elected vice-president with most of the vote.

== Death and legacy ==
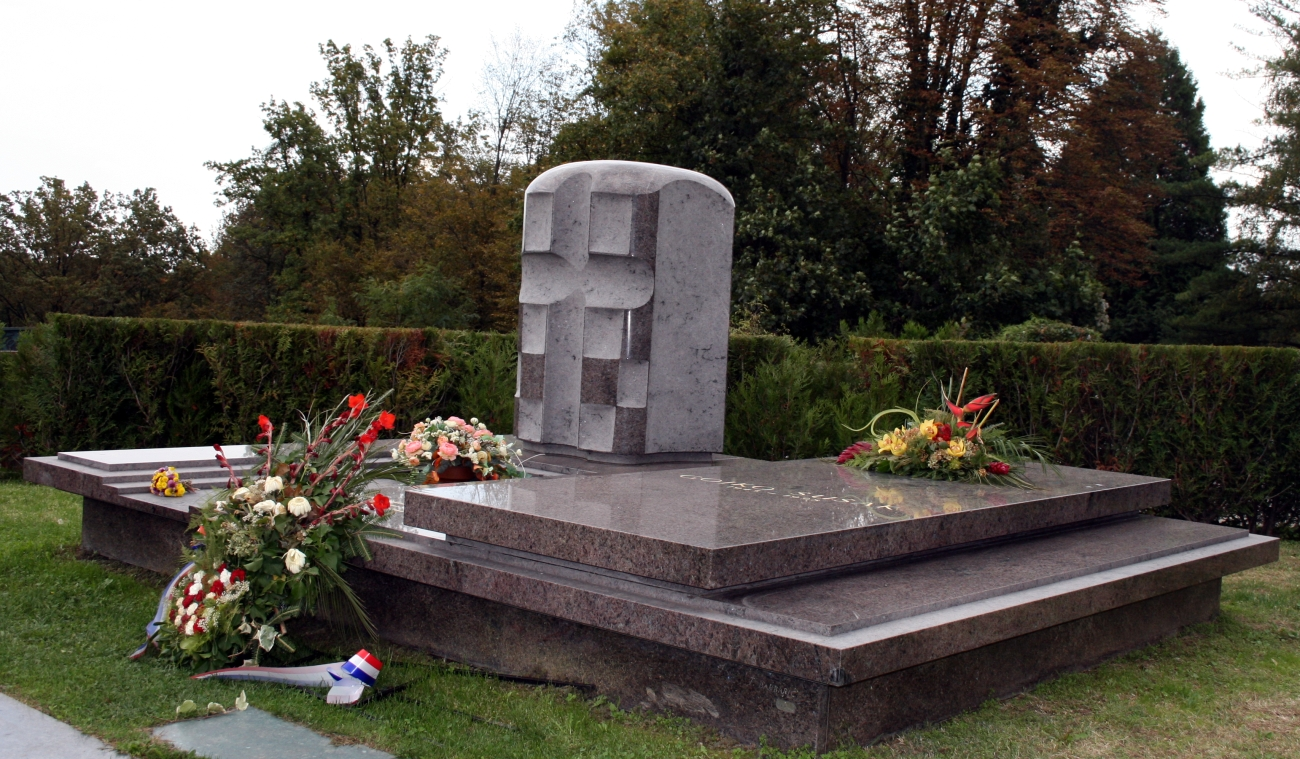
The grave of Gojko Šušak in Zagreb

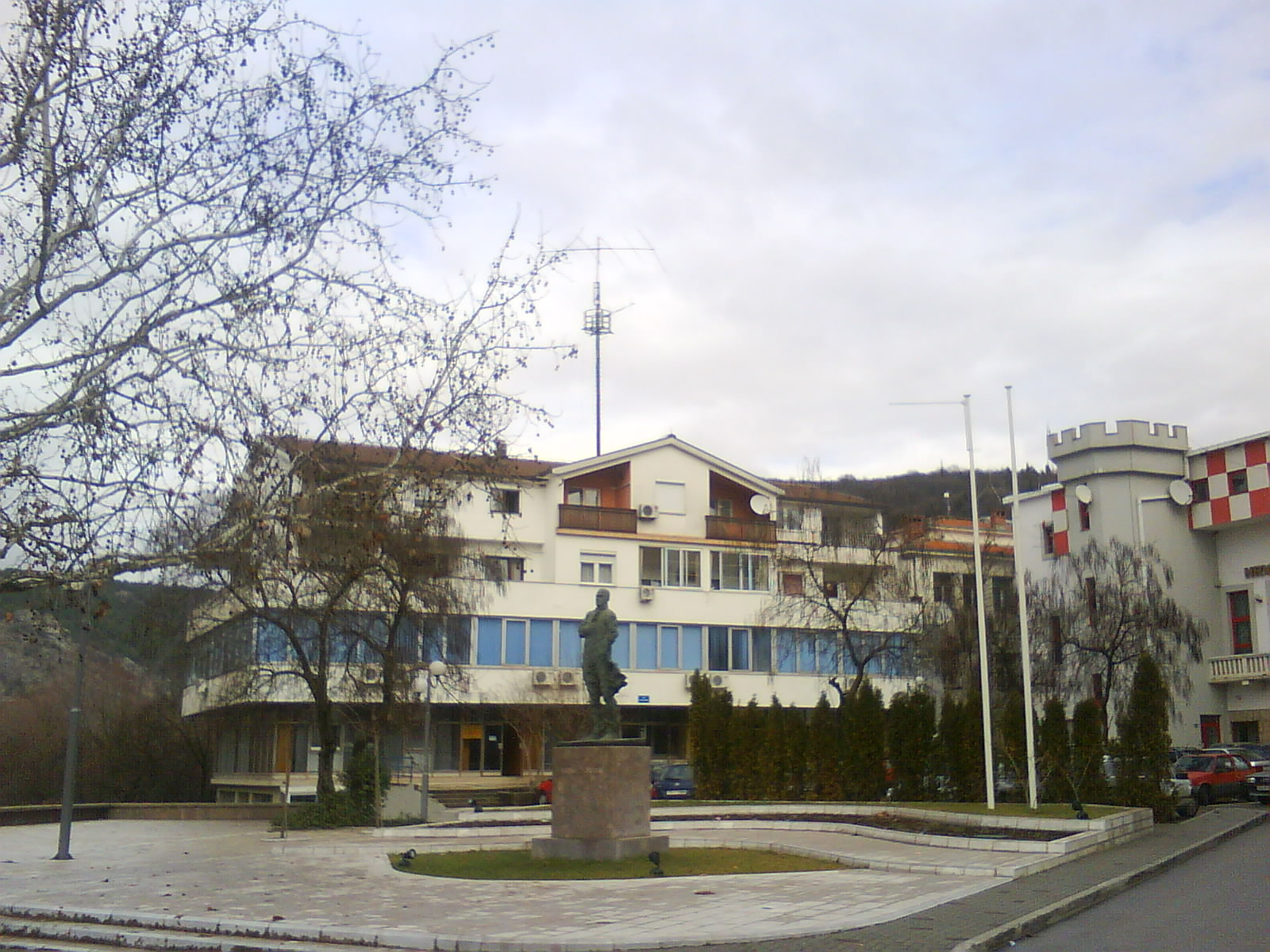
Gojko Šušak Square in Široki Brijeg

Šušak was diagnosed with lung cancer in early 1996 and was treated in Walter Reed Army Medical Center in the same year, just like Tuđman, who was also diagnosed with cancer in 1993. He was operated in Croatia and received treatment for cancer in the following years. With medical supervision his disease was under control, until late April 1998 when he had a rapid deterioration. Šušak died in Zagreb's Clinical Hospital Dubrava on the evening of 3 May 1998, at the age of 53. A day of mourning was declared and he was buried on 7 May at the Mirogoj Cemetery in Zagreb. William Perry attended Šušak's funeral as an official representative of the United States and said that "to Croatians he was crucial to the establishment of freedom here. To Americans he was crucial to the establishment of peace and stability in the region".

After Šušak's death, Ivić Pašalić took over as head of the Herzegovina lobby. By 2000, about 300 million euros were transferred by the Croatian government into Herzegovina each year, mostly from the budget of the Ministries of Defence, Reconstruction, and Social Affairs.

An arterial road in Zagreb, the Gojko Šušak Avenue was named posthumously after him. In Široki Brijeg and Sinj a square was named after Šušak. On 31 May 2008, on the occasion of the tenth anniversary of his death, a monument in tribute to Šušak was unveiled in his birthplace Široki Brijeg.

In May 2013, the ICTY, in a first-instance verdict against Jadranko Prlić, found that Šušak, Tuđman and Bobetko took part in the joint criminal enterprise against the non-Croat population of Bosnia and Herzegovina during the Bosnian War. However, on 19 July 2016 the Appeals Chamber in the case announced that the "Trial Chamber made no explicit findings concerning [Tudjman's, Šušak's and Bobetko's] participation in the JCE and did not find [them] guilty of any crimes." In November 2017, the ICTY upheld the 2013 JCE verdict.

== Honours ==
Ribbon	Decoration	Decoration date
	Grand Order of King Dmitar Zvonimir	5 May 1998
	Grand Order of King Petar Krešimir IV	28 May 1995
	Order of Duke Domagoj	28 May 1995
	Order of Nikola Šubić Zrinski	28 May 1995
	Order of Ante Starčević	28 May 1995
	Order of Stjepan Radić	28 May 1995
	Order of the Croatian Trefoil	28 May 1995
	Homeland's Gratitude Medal	28 May 1995

== Notes ==
Political offices
Preceded by Luka Bebić	Minister of Defence of Croatia; 1991–1998	Succeeded by Andrija Hebrang
New title	Minister of Emigration of Croatia; 1990–1991	Succeeded by Zdravko Sančević
