= Beder =

Beder may refer to:

- Beder (ancient ruler), a claimed Tjeker ruler in ancient Egypt
- Beder, Croatia, a settlement near Samobor
- Beder, Denmark, a town and suburb of Aarhus
- Bedër University, a university in Tirana, Albania

== People with the surname ==
- Sharon Beder, Australian environmentalist and academic

== People with the given name ==
- Beder Caicedo (born 1992), Ecuadorian footballer
- Beder Yusupova (1901–1969), Soviet Bashkiria actress, teacher

== See also ==
- Bedar (disambiguation)
- Bedder, a housekeeper in a college of the University of Cambridge
