= Gregurić Breg =

Coordinates: 45°47′N 15°39′E

- Settlement
- Location within Croatia
- Country: Croatia
- County: Zagreb
- City: Samobor

Area
  - Total: 3.8 km^{2} (1.5 sq mi)

Population (2021)
  - Total: 106
  - Density: 28/km^{2} (72/sq mi)
- Time zone: UTC+1 (CET)
  - Summer (DST): UTC+2 (CEST)

Gregurić Breg is a settlement (naselje) in the Samobor administrative territory of Zagreb County, Croatia. As of 2011 it had a population of 118 people.
