= Vratnik Samoborski =

- Settlement
- Location within Croatia
- Country: Croatia
- County: Zagreb
- City: Samobor

Area
  - Total: 2.2 km^{2} (0.85 sq mi)

Population (2021)
  - Total: 93
  - Density: 42/km^{2} (110/sq mi)
- Time zone: UTC+1 (CET)
  - Summer (DST): UTC+2 (CEST)

Vratnik Samoborski is a settlement (naselje) in the Samobor administrative territory of Zagreb County, Croatia. It had a population of 108 people in 2011.
