= Mala Rakovica =

Coordinates: 45°47′N 15°43′E

- Settlement
- Location within Croatia
- Country: Croatia
- County: Zagreb
- City: Samobor

Area
  - Total: 2.1 km^{2} (0.81 sq mi)

Population (2021)
  - Total: 604
  - Density: 290/km^{2} (740/sq mi)
- Time zone: UTC+1 (CET)
  - Summer (DST): UTC+2 (CEST)

Mala Rakovica is a settlement (naselje) in the Samobor administrative territory of Zagreb County, Croatia. As of 2011, it had a population of 745 people.
