= Podvrh, Croatia =

- Settlement
- Country: Croatia
- County: Zagreb
- City: Samobor

Population (2011)
  - Total: 562
- Time zone: UTC+1 (CET)
  - Summer (DST): UTC+2 (CEST)

Podvrh, Croatia is a settlement (naselje) in the Samobor administrative territory of Zagreb County, Croatia. As of 2011 it had a population of 562 people.
