= Stojdraga =

- Village
- Location within Croatia
- Coordinates: 45°51′0″N 15°35′0″E
- Country: Croatia
- County: Zagreb County
- Municipality: Samobor

Area
  - Total: 5.6 km^{2} (2.2 sq mi)

Population (2021)
  - Total: 48
  - Density: 8.6/km^{2} (22/sq mi)
- Time zone: UTC+1 (CET)
  - Summer (DST): UTC+2 (CEST)

Stojdraga is a village in Zagreb County, Croatia. The village is located in the north-western area of Croatia near the border with Slovenia. It is located kilometers away from Zagreb, Croatia.

== Population ==
According to the 2001 census, the settlement had 91 inhabitants and 39 family households.

Kretanje broja stanovnika 1857-2001
v

population	113	137	168	184	186	210	202	204	192	193	161	162	128	109	91
	1857	1869	1880	1890	1900	1910	1921	1931	1948	1953	1961	1971	1981	1991	2001

Sources: Croatian Bureau of Statistics publications
