= Farkaševec Samoborski =

- Settlement
- Location within Croatia
- Coordinates: 45.8083°N 15.7458°E
- Country: Croatia
- County: Zagreb
- City: Samobor

Area
  - Total: 1.5 km^{2} (0.58 sq mi)

Population (2021)
  - Total: 467
  - Density: 310/km^{2} (810/sq mi)
- Time zone: UTC+1 (CET)
  - Summer (DST): UTC+2 (CEST)

Farkaševec Samoborski is a settlement (naselje) in the Samobor administrative territory of Zagreb County, Croatia. As of 2011 it had a population of 454 people.
