= Kravljak =

Coordinates: 45°49′N 15°33′E

- Settlement
- Location within Croatia
- Country: Croatia
- County: Zagreb
- City: Samobor

Population (2011)
  - Total: 15
- Time zone: UTC+1 (CET)
  - Summer (DST): UTC+2 (CEST)

Kravljak is a settlement (naselje) in the Samobor administrative territory of Zagreb County, Croatia. As of 2011 it had a population of 15 people.
