= Golubići, Croatia =

Coordinates: 44°14′N 15°53′E

Golubići
- Settlement
- Location within Croatia
- Country: Croatia
- County: Zagreb
- City: Samobor

Population (2011)
  - Total: 17
- Time zone: UTC+1 (CET)
  - Summer (DST): UTC+2 (CEST)

Golubići Croatian pronunciation: [ɡoluˈbitɕi]; is a settlement (naselje) in the Samobor administrative territory of Zagreb County, Croatia. As of 2011 it had a population of 17 people.
