= Bedar =

Bedar may refer to:

- Bedar (ship), traditional double-ended Malay ship
- Bédar, municipality of Almería province in Spain
- Bedar (Kabul), delegate to Afghanistan's Constitutional Loya Jirga
- Alternative name for the Ramoshi, Indian community of Maharashtra, Madhya Pradesh, and Karnataka

== See also ==
- Bader (disambiguation)
- Beder (disambiguation)
