= Sječevac =

- Settlement
- Location in Croatia
- Coordinates: 45°48′03″N 15°30′50″E
- Country: Croatia
- County: Zagreb
- City: Samobor

Area
  - Total: 4.6 km^{2} (1.8 sq mi)

Population (2021)
  - Total: 8
  - Density: 1.7/km^{2} (4.5/sq mi)
- Time zone: UTC+1 (CET)
  - Summer (DST): UTC+2 (CEST)

Sječevac is a settlement (naselje) in the Samobor administrative territory of Zagreb County, Croatia. As of 2011 it had a population of 14 people.
