= Grdanjci =

- Settlement
- St. Joseph's Chapel in Grdanjci

- Location within Croatia
- Coordinates: 45.825°N 15.65°E
- Country: Croatia
- County: Zagreb
- City: Samobor

Area
  - Total: 4.4 km^{2} (1.7 sq mi)

Population (2021)
  - Total: 318
  - Density: 72/km^{2} (190/sq mi)
- Time zone: UTC+1 (CET)
  - Summer (DST): UTC+2 (CEST)

Grdanjci is a settlement (naselje) in the Samobor administrative territory of Zagreb County, Croatia. As of 2011 it had a population of 307 people.

== Bibliography ==
=== Biology ===
- Šašić, Martina; Nahirnić, Ana; Tarmann, Gerhard M. (2016-12-31). "Zygaenidae (Lepidoptera) in the Lepidoptera collections of the Croatian Natural History Museum". Natura Croatica: Periodicum Musei Historiae Naturalis Croatici. 25 (2): 233–248. doi:10.20302/NC.2016.25.19. eISSN 1848-7386.
