= Šipački Breg =

- Settlement
- Location within Croatia
- Country: Croatia
- County: Zagreb
- City: Samobor

Area
  - Total: 2.3 km^{2} (0.89 sq mi)

Population (2021)
  - Total: 33
  - Density: 14/km^{2} (37/sq mi)
- Time zone: UTC+1 (CET)
  - Summer (DST): UTC+2 (CEST)

Šipački Breg is a settlement (naselje) in the Samobor administrative territory of Zagreb County, Croatia. As of 2011 it had a population of 44 people.
