= Gradna =

- Settlement
- Location within Croatia
- Country: Croatia
- County: Zagreb
- City: Samobor

Area
  - Total: 1.3 km^{2} (0.50 sq mi)

Population (2021)
  - Total: 541
  - Density: 420/km^{2} (1,100/sq mi)
- Time zone: UTC+1 (CET)
  - Summer (DST): UTC+2 (CEST)

Gradna Gradna is a settlement (naselje) in the Samobor administrative territory of Zagreb County, Croatia. As of 2011 it had a population of 541 people.[1]
