= Mali Lipovec, Croatia =

Coordinates: 45°45′N 15°37′E

Mali Lipovec
- Settlement
- Interactive map of Mali Lipovec
- Location within Croatia
- Country: Croatia
- County: Zagreb
- City: Samobor

Population (2011)
  - Total: 122
- Time zone: UTC+1 (CET)
  - Summer (DST): UTC+2 (CEST)

Mali Lipovec is a village in the Samobor administrative territory of Zagreb County, Croatia. As of 2011 it had a population of 122 people.
