= Medsave =

Coordinates: 45°50′N 15°46′E

- Settlement
- Location within Croatia
- Country: Croatia
- County: Zagreb
- City: Samobor

Area
  - Total: 2.0 km^{2} (0.77 sq mi)

Population (2021)
  - Total: 206
  - Density: 100/km^{2} (270/sq mi)
- Time zone: UTC+1 (CET)
  - Summer (DST): UTC+2 (CEST)

Medsave is a settlement (naselje) in the Samobor administrative territory of Zagreb County, Croatia. As of 2011 it had a population of 242 people.
