= Bratelji =

- Settlement
- Location within Croatia
- Coordinates: 45°45′45.0″N 15°39′29.9″E
- Country: Croatia
- County: Zagreb
- City: Samobor

Area
  - Total: 1.9 km^{2} (0.73 sq mi)

Population (2021)
  - Total: 11
  - Density: 5.8/km^{2} (15/sq mi)
- Time zone: UTC+1 (CET)
  - Summer (DST): UTC+2 (CEST)

Bratelji is a settlement (naselje) in the Samobor administrative territory of Zagreb County, Croatia. As of 2011 it had a population of 17 people.
