= Otruševec =

- Settlement
- Location within Croatia
- Coordinates: 45°49′1.53″N 15°40′19.58″E
- Country: Croatia
- County: Zagreb
- City: Samobor

Area
  - Total: 2.1 km^{2} (0.81 sq mi)

Population (2021)
  - Total: 292
  - Density: 140/km^{2} (360/sq mi)
- Time zone: UTC+1 (CET)
  - Summer (DST): UTC+2 (CEST)

Otruševec is a settlement (naselje) in the Samobor administrative territory of Zagreb County, Croatia. As of 2011 it had a population of 303 people.
