= Dragonoš =

- Settlement
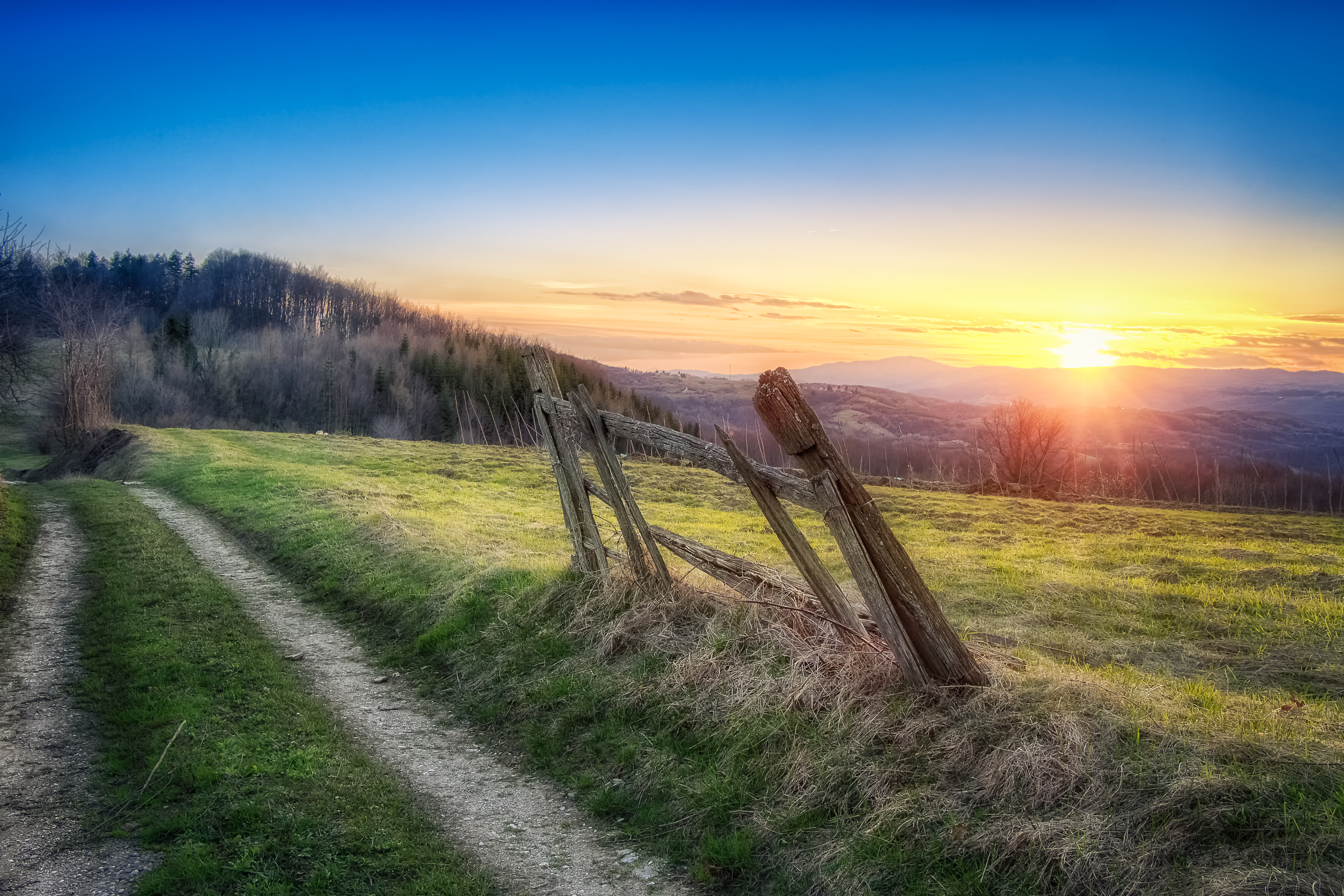
- Spring sunset at Dragonos village

- Location within Croatia
- Country: Croatia
- County: Zagreb
- City: Samobor

Area
  - Total: 4.9 km^{2} (1.9 sq mi)

Population (2021)
  - Total: 13
  - Density: 2.7/km^{2} (6.9/sq mi)
- Time zone: UTC+1 (CET)
  - Summer (DST): UTC+2 (CEST)

Dragonoš is a settlement (naselje) in the Samobor administrative territory of Zagreb County, Croatia. As of 2011 it had a population of 21 people.
