= Slani Dol =

- Settlement
- Interactive map of Slani Dol
- Location within Croatia
- Coordinates: 45°47′N 15°38′E
- Country: Croatia
- County: Zagreb
- City: Samobor

Area
  - Total: 4.0 km^{2} (1.5 sq mi)

Population (2021)
  - Total: 169
  - Density: 42/km^{2} (110/sq mi)
- Time zone: UTC+1 (CET)
  - Summer (DST): UTC+2 (CEST)

Slani Dol is a settlement (naselje) in the Samobor administrative territory of Zagreb County, Croatia. As of 2011 it had a population of 208 people.
