= Rude, Croatia =

Settlement in Zagreb County, Croatia

Rude
- Settlement
- Interactive map of Rude
- Location of Rude in Croatia
- Coordinates: 45°46′01″N 15°40′01″E
- Country: Croatia
- County: Zagreb County
- City: Samobor

Area
  - Total: 6.9 km^{2} (2.7 sq mi)

Population (2021)
  - Total: 1,087
  - Density: 160/km^{2} (410/sq mi)
- Time zone: UTC+1 (CET)
  - Summer (DST): UTC+2 (CEST)
- Postal code: 10430 Samobor
- Area code: +385 (0)1

Rude is a settlement in the City of Samobor in Croatia.

In 2021, its population was 1087. In 2011 it had a population of 1,131 people.

The town of Rude in the Samoborska Gora Mountains was a source of copper as early as the 16th century. In fact, its copper production at the time "was twice the amount of the total copper production in England and four times that of Norway, reaching one third of the production of the famous Swedish mine in Falun."

== Demographics ==
Rude: Population trends 1857–2021
v

population	1405	1363	1324	1427	1424	1481	1370	1298	1310	1310	1306	1323	1253	1208	1141	1131	1087
	1857	1869	1880	1890	1900	1910	1921	1931	1948	1953	1961	1971	1981	1991	2001	2011	2021

Sources: Croatian Bureau of Statistics publications
