= Osredek Žumberački =

- Settlement
- Location within Croatia
- Coordinates: 45.8°N 15.4889°E
- Country: Croatia
- County: Zagreb
- City: Samobor

Area
  - Total: 2.1 km^{2} (0.81 sq mi)

Population (2021)
  - Total: 13
  - Density: 6.2/km^{2} (16/sq mi)
- Time zone: UTC+1 (CET)
  - Summer (DST): UTC+2 (CEST)

Osredek Žumberački is a settlement (naselje) in the Samobor administrative territory of Zagreb County, Croatia. As of 2011 it had a population of 22 people.
