= Novo Selo Žumberačko =

- Settlement
- Location within Croatia
- Country: Croatia
- County: Zagreb
- City: Samobor

Area
  - Total: 4.2 km^{2} (1.6 sq mi)

Population (2021)
  - Total: 18
  - Density: 4.3/km^{2} (11/sq mi)
- Time zone: UTC+1 (CET)
  - Summer (DST): UTC+2 (CEST)

Novo Selo Žumberačko is a settlement (naselje) in the Samobor administrative territory of Zagreb County, Croatia. As of 2011 it had a population of 24 people. The etymology of the village comes from Slavic languages meaning new village, Novo Selo.
