= Kostanjevec Podvrški =

Coordinates: 45°50′N 15°36′E

- Settlement
- Location within Croatia
- Country: Croatia
- County: Zagreb
- City: Samobor

Area
  - Total: 5.0 km^{2} (1.9 sq mi)

Population (2021)
  - Total: 69
  - Density: 14/km^{2} (36/sq mi)
- Time zone: UTC+1 (CET)
  - Summer (DST): UTC+2 (CEST)

Kostanjevec Podvrški is a settlement (naselje) in the Samobor administrative territory of Zagreb County, Croatia. As of 2011 it had a population of 89 people.
