= Manja Vas =

- Settlement
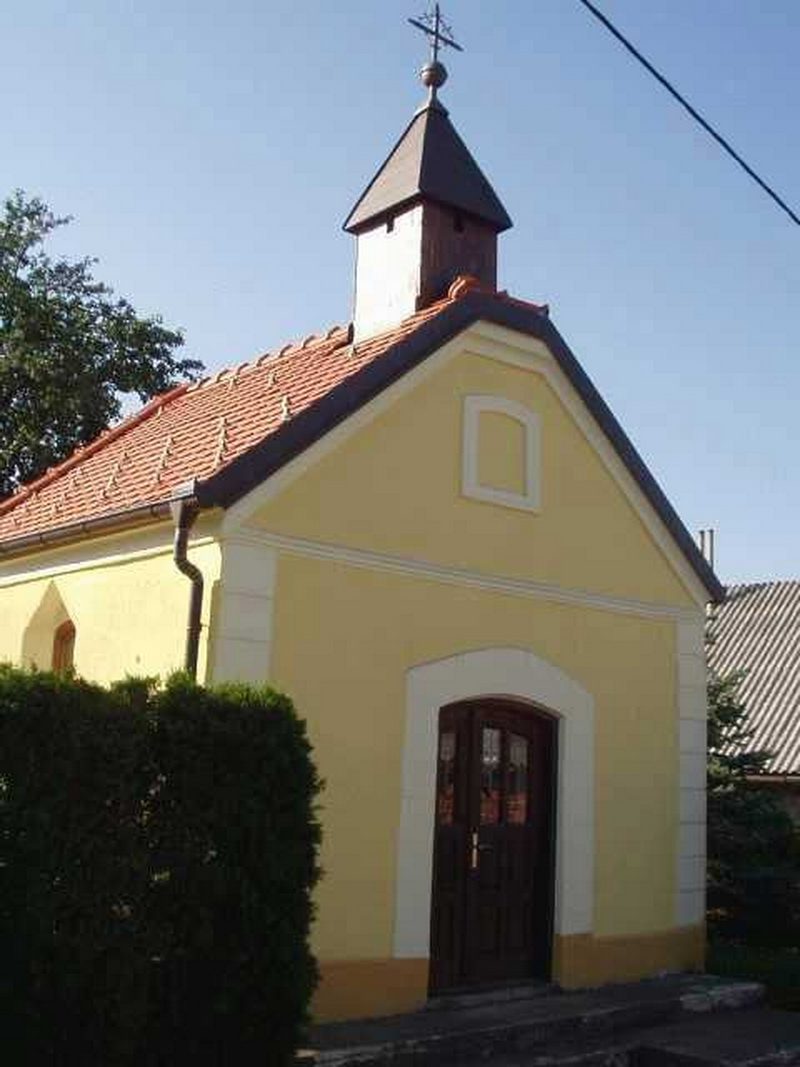
- Chapel at Manja Vas

- Location within Croatia
- Country: Croatia
- County: Zagreb
- City: Samobor

Area
  - Total: 0.9 km^{2} (0.35 sq mi)

Population (2021)
  - Total: 76
  - Density: 84/km^{2} (220/sq mi)
- Time zone: UTC+1 (CET)
  - Summer (DST): UTC+2 (CEST)

Manja Vas is a settlement (naselje) in the Samobor administrative territory of Zagreb County, Croatia. As of 2011 it had a population of 80 people.
