= Vrbovec Samoborski =

Coordinates: 45°49′N 15°46′E

- Settlement
- Location within Croatia
- Country: Croatia
- County: Zagreb
- City: Samobor

Area
  - Total: 3.1 km^{2} (1.2 sq mi)

Population (2021)
  - Total: 263
  - Density: 85/km^{2} (220/sq mi)
- Time zone: UTC+1 (CET)
  - Summer (DST): UTC+2 (CEST)

Vrbovec Samoborski is a settlement (naselje) in the Samobor administrative territory of Zagreb County, Croatia. As of 2011 it had a population of 271 people.
