= Dane, Zagreb County =

Coordinates: 45°28′N 14°02′E

Dane, Croatia
- Settlement
- Location within Croatia
- Country: Croatia
- County: Zagreb
- City: Samobor

Area
  - Total: 2.0 km^{2} (0.77 sq mi)

Population (2021)
  - Total: 7
  - Density: 3.5/km^{2} (9.1/sq mi)
- Time zone: UTC+1 (CET)
  - Summer (DST): UTC+2 (CEST)

Dane, Croatia is a settlement (naselje) in the Samobor administrative territory of Zagreb County, Croatia. As of 2011 it had a population of 14 people.
