= Bruno Bušić =

Croatian writer (1939–1978)

- Born: Ante Bruno Bušić; 6 October 1939; Vinjani Donji, Banovina of Croatia, Kingdom of Yugoslavia
- Died: 16 October 1978 (aged 39); Paris, France
- Occupations: Writer, Political dissident

Ante Bruno Bušić (6 October 1939 – 16 October 1978) was a Croatian writer and critic of the government of Socialist Federal Republic of Yugoslavia. He was one of the best-known victims of UDBA (Yugoslav secret police) killings.

== Biography ==
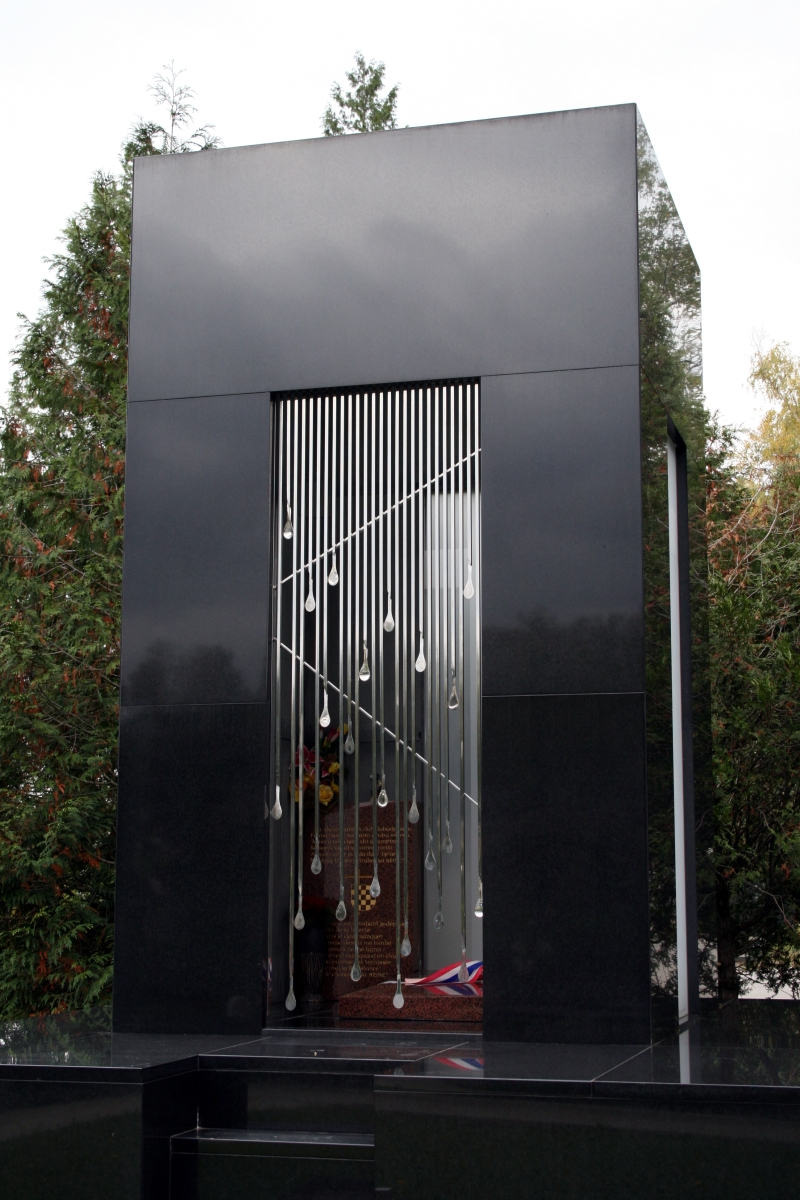
Bruno Bušić's grave at Mirogoj cemetery in Zagreb

Bušić was born in the village of Vinjani Donji near Imotski. By the time he enrolled in high school in Imotski, he was already involved in activities which communist authorities considered rebellious. In 1957, he joined a group called Tiho (silently, lit. - quietly) whose aim was to "fight for freedom, equality and the formation of a free Croatia based on democratic principles". It was at that time that the UDBA (Yugoslav secret police) began watching him. Bušić, along with his schoolmates who had also participated in Tiho, was expelled from school soon after.

Two years later, the expelled students were allowed to return to school. Bušić went on to enrol in the University of Zagreb and earned a degree in economics in 1964. The following year, he got a job at the Institute for the History of the Workers' Movement in Croatia, which was run by former Yugoslav general and future Croatian president Franjo Tuđman. In 1966, he was sentenced to prison for his political views, but he had escaped to Vienna, Austria during the trial with co-convict Rudolf Arapović. At the behest of Tuđman, who still had great influence in Yugoslavia, Bušić returned to Zagreb and was not sent to prison. In 1967, he resumed work at the Institute.

In 1969, Bušić moved on to write for the Hrvatski književni list (Croatian Literary Paper). There, he confronted several issues considered controversial by Yugoslav officials. The paper was eventually banned. This led Bušić to emigrate to Paris for a period of time during which he attended the Sorbonne. Upon his return in 1971, he became one of the directors of the Hrvatski tjednik (Croatian Weekly). That same year, the Yugoslav government issued a crackdown on what had been called the Croatian Spring (Hrvatsko proljeće). Bušić was among those arrested and spent time in prison until 1973.

He left Yugoslavia for the last time in 1975. He spent most of the time afterwards living in England, but travelled extensively through the rest of Europe. He wrote for Nova Hrvatska (New Croatia) during this period.

He was killed in Paris, France, in 1978. While it is suspected that an agent of the UDBA, the Yugoslav secret police, may have been involved, the identity of the killer remains unknown.

Exactly 21 years after his death, with Croatia having gained independence, his remains were moved from Paris to the Mirogoj cemetery in Zagreb and laid to rest next to the dead of the Croatian War of Independence.

Vinko Sindičić, a former UDBA agent, was prosecuted for the murder of Bušić. He was found not guilty in 2000. On 6 June 2005, Supreme Court of Croatia upheld the verdict.

== Honours ==
- Order of Duke Domagoj 1995 (posthumously)
- Order of Stjepan Radić 1995 (posthumously)
