= Bobovica, Croatia =

Coordinates: 45°50′N 15°44′E

- Settlement
- Location within Croatia
- Country: Croatia
- County: Zagreb
- City: Samobor

Area
  - Total: 1.8 km^{2} (0.69 sq mi)

Population (2021)
  - Total: 258
  - Density: 140/km^{2} (370/sq mi)
- Time zone: UTC+1 (CET)
  - Summer (DST): UTC+2 (CEST)

Bobovica, Croatia is a settlement (naselje) in the Samobor administrative territory of Zagreb County, Croatia. As of 2011 it had a population of 285 people.
