= Veliki Lipovec, Croatia =

Coordinates: 45°46′N 15°38′E

- Settlement
- Location within Croatia
- Country: Croatia
- County: Zagreb
- City: Samobor

Area
  - Total: 2.4 km^{2} (0.93 sq mi)

Population (2021)
  - Total: 72
  - Density: 30/km^{2} (78/sq mi)
- Time zone: UTC+1 (CET)
  - Summer (DST): UTC+2 (CEST)

Veliki Lipovec, Croatia is a settlement (naselje) in the Samobor administrative territory of Zagreb County, Croatia. As of 2011 it had a population of 85 people.
