= Molvice, Zagreb County =

Coordinates: 45°46′N 15°45′E

Molvice
- Settlement
- Location within Croatia
- Country: Croatia
- County: Zagreb
- City: Samobor

Area
  - Total: 5.8 km^{2} (2.2 sq mi)

Population (2021)
  - Total: 659
  - Density: 110/km^{2} (290/sq mi)
- Time zone: UTC+1 (CET)
  - Summer (DST): UTC+2 (CEST)

Molvice is a settlement (naselje) in the Samobor administrative territory of Zagreb County, Croatia. As of 2011 it had a population of 642 people.
