= Order of Stjepan Radić =

Order of Stjepan Radić Red Stjepana Radića
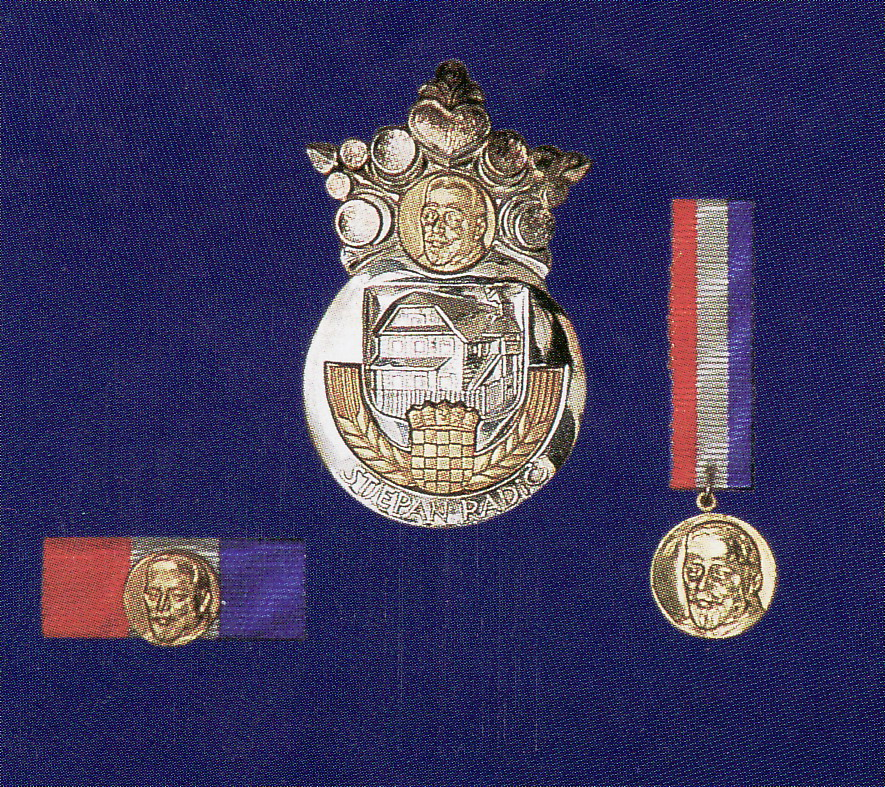
- Order of Stjepan Radić (top: Order medal; right: smaller decorative version; left: Order ribbon)
- Type: State order
- Awarded for: services and sacrifices for the national and social rights of the Croatian people
- Country: Republic of Croatia
- Presented by: the President of Croatia
- Eligibility: Croatian and foreign citizens
- Status: Active
- Established: 10 March 1995
- Banner of the Order of Stjepan Radić

Precedence
- Next (higher): Order of Ante Starčević
- Next (lower): Order of Danica Hrvatska

The Order of Stjepan Radić (Croatian: Red Stjepana Radića) is a Croatian national decoration which ranks thirteenth in importance. The order was formed on 1 April 1995.

The Order of Stjepan Radić is granted to Croatians and foreigners for services and sacrifices for the national and social rights of the Croatian people. It is named after Stjepan Radić.

== Notable recipients ==
- Rudolf Perešin
- Ruža Tomašić
- Franjo Tuđman
- Bruno Bušić
- Rudolf Arapović
- Nikola Štedul

== Sources ==
- Law of decorations and recognitions of the Republic of Croatia ("Narodne novine", no. 20/95., 57/06. i 141/06.) - articles 6 and 17
- Statute of Order of Stjepan Radić ("Narodne novine", no. 108/00. from November 3, 2000).
