= Javorek, Czech Republic =

Javorek
- Municipality
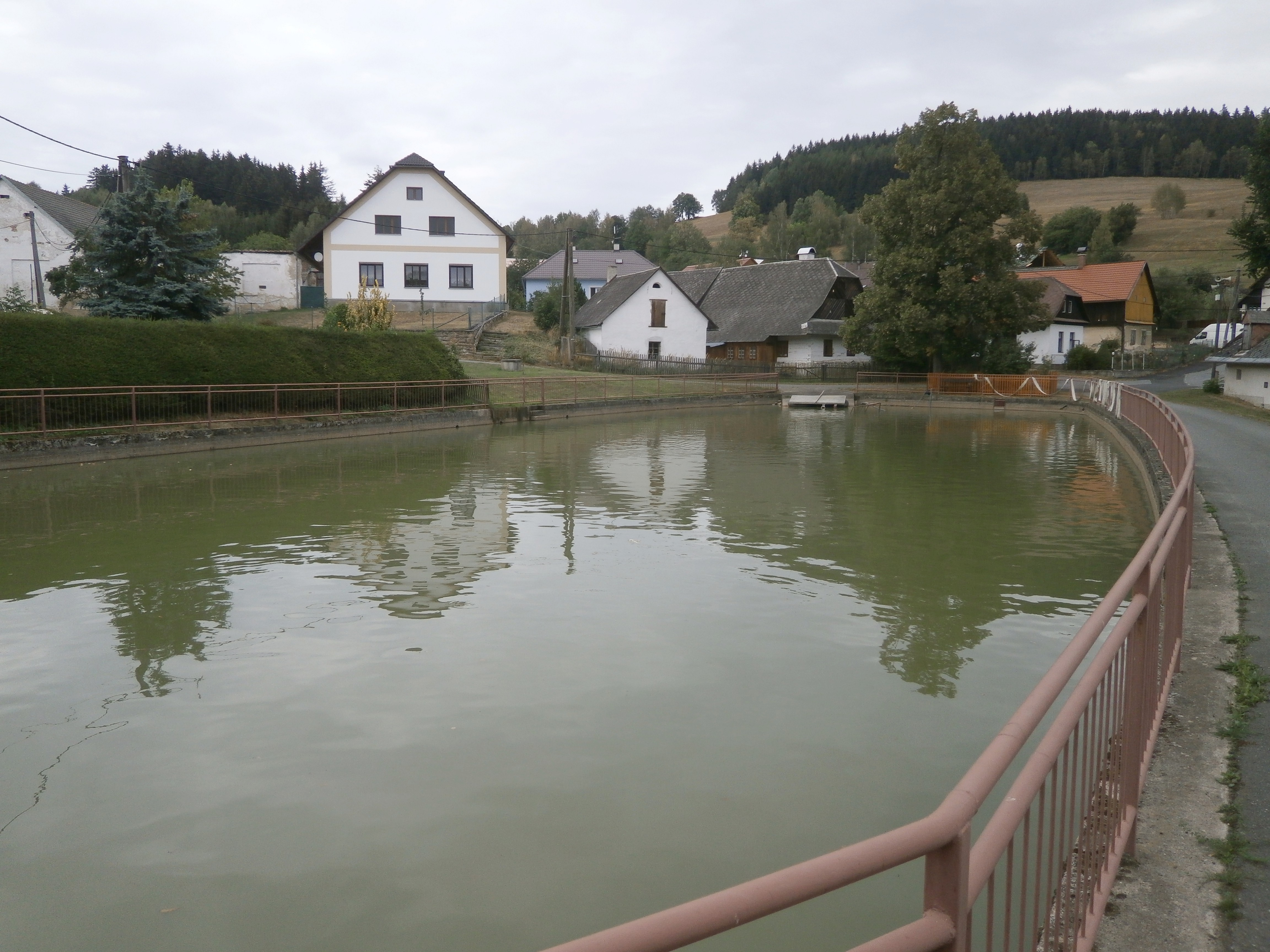
- Centre of Javorek

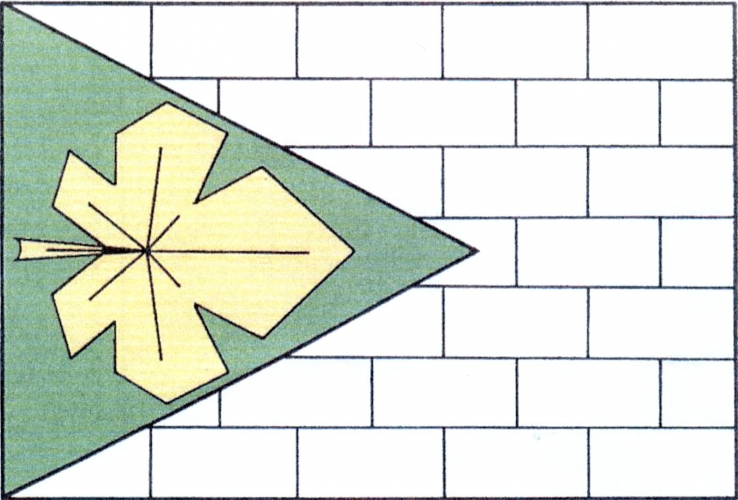
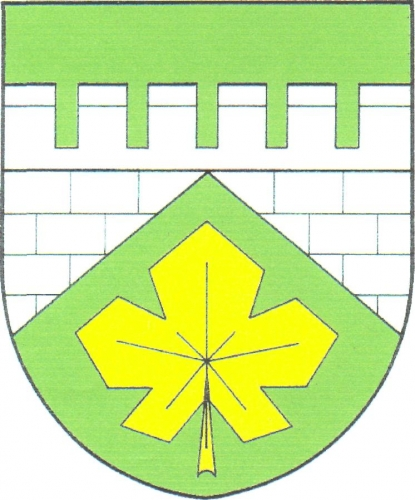
- Flag Coat of arms

- Location in the Czech Republic
- Coordinates: 49°39′0″N 16°10′26″E
- Country: Czech Republic
- Region: Vysočina
- District: Žďár nad Sázavou
- First mentioned: 1364

Area
  - Total: 3.90 km^{2} (1.51 sq mi)
- Elevation: 590 m (1,940 ft)

Population (2026-01-01)
  - Total: 107
  - Density: 27.4/km^{2} (71.1/sq mi)
- Time zone: UTC+1 (CET)
  - Summer (DST): UTC+2 (CEST)
- Postal code: 592 03
- Website: www.javorek.cz

Javorek is a municipality and village in Žďár nad Sázavou District in the Vysočina Region of the Czech Republic. It has about 100 inhabitants.

Javorek lies approximately 20 kilometres (12 mi) north-east of Žďár nad Sázavou, 51 km (32 mi) north-east of Jihlava, and 135 km (84 mi) east of Prague.

== Demographics ==
Historical population
Year	Pop.	±%
1869	321	—
1880	299	−6.9%
1890	283	−5.4%
1900	304	+7.4%
1910	328	+7.9%
1921	289	−11.9%
1930	257	−11.1%
1950	165	−35.8%
1961	134	−18.8%
1970	137	+2.2%
1980	110	−19.7%
1991	92	−16.4%
2001	106	+15.2%
2011	101	−4.7%
2021	108	+6.9%
Source: Censuses
