= Beder, Croatia =

Coordinates: 45°49′N 15°37′E

- Settlement
- Location within Croatia
- Country: Croatia
- County: Zagreb
- City: Samobor

Area
  - Total: 4.1 km^{2} (1.6 sq mi)

Population (2021)
  - Total: 68
  - Density: 17/km^{2} (43/sq mi)
- Time zone: UTC+1 (CET)
  - Summer (DST): UTC+2 (CEST)

Beder, Croatia is a settlement (naselje) in the Samobor administrative territory of Zagreb County, Croatia. As of 2011 it had a population of 83 people.
