= Samobor =

- City
- Grad Samobor; City of Samobor
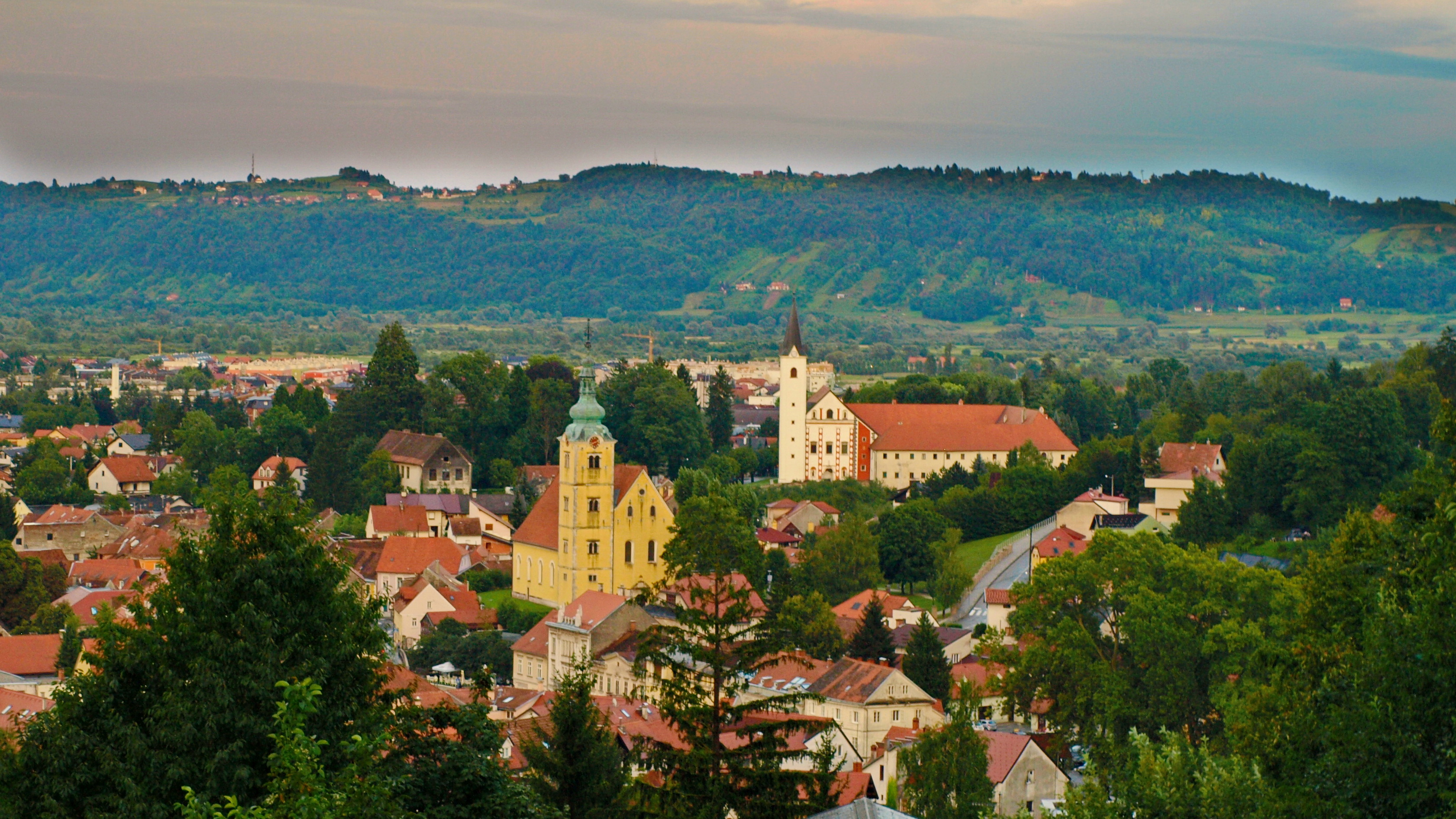
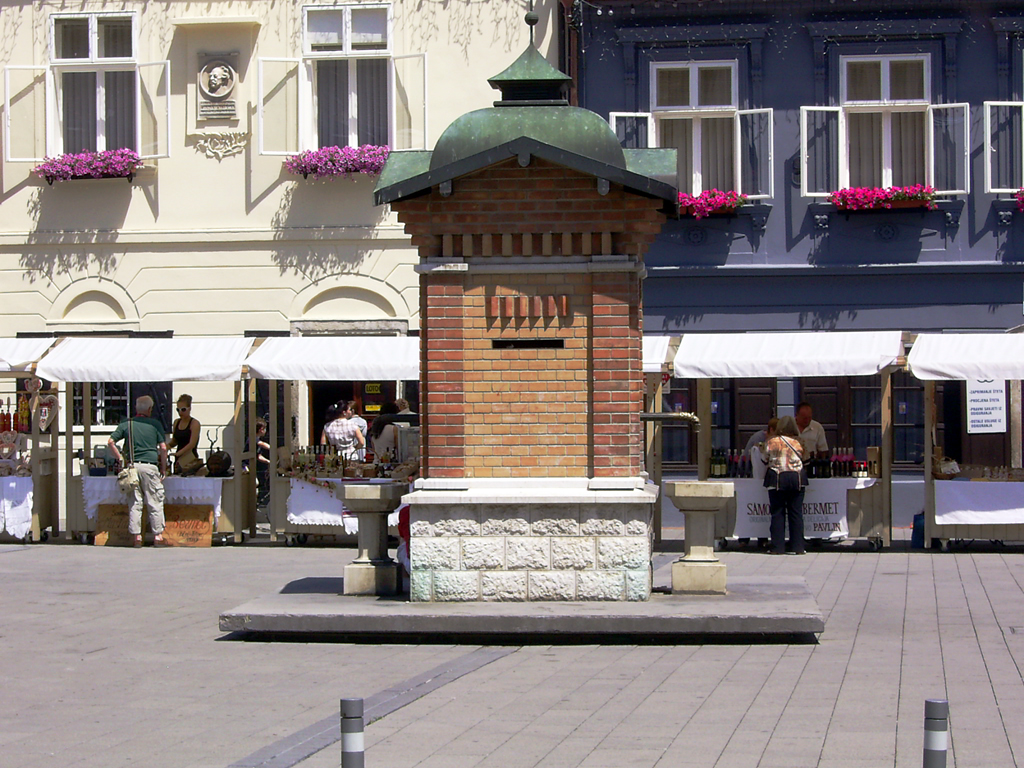
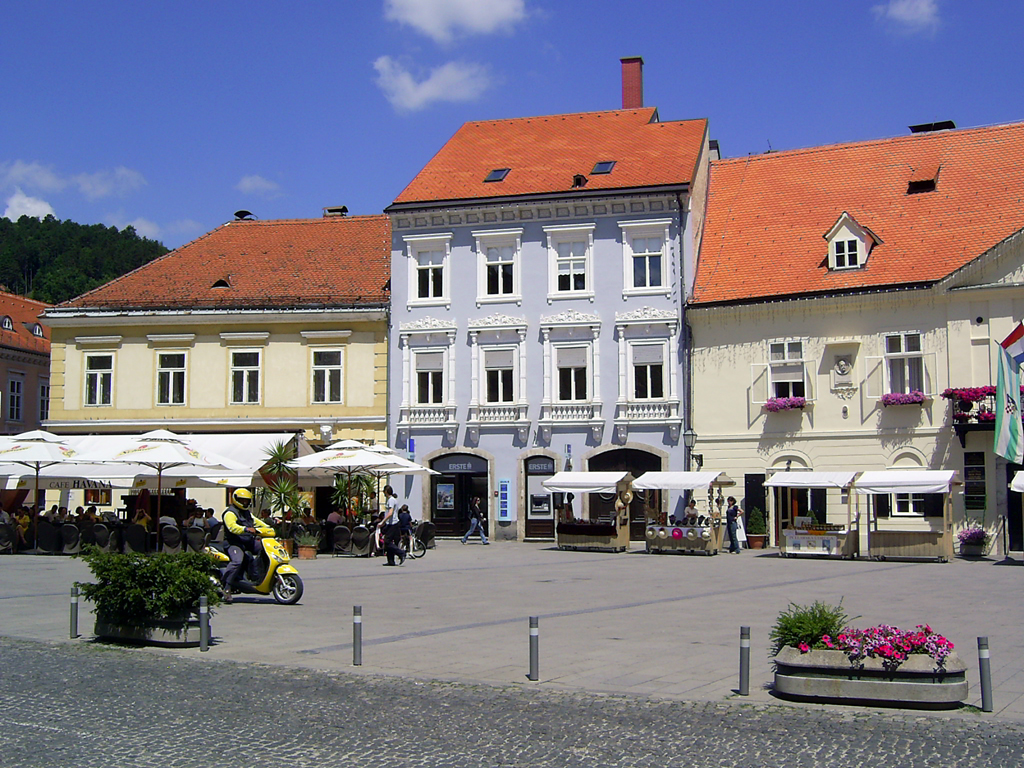
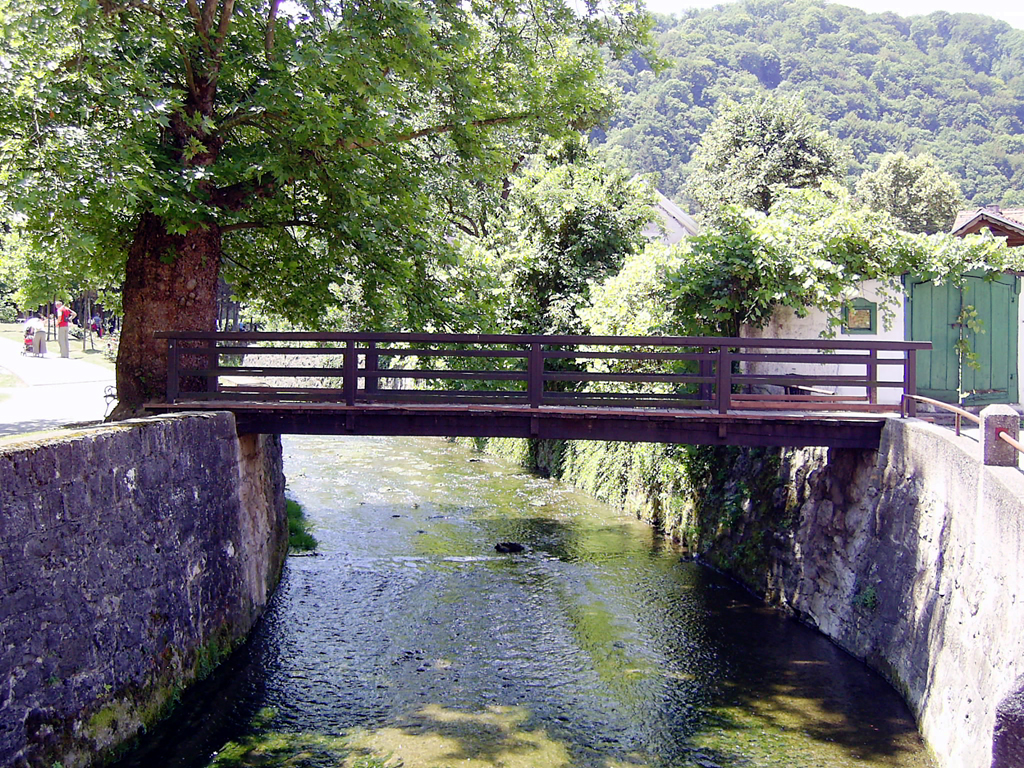
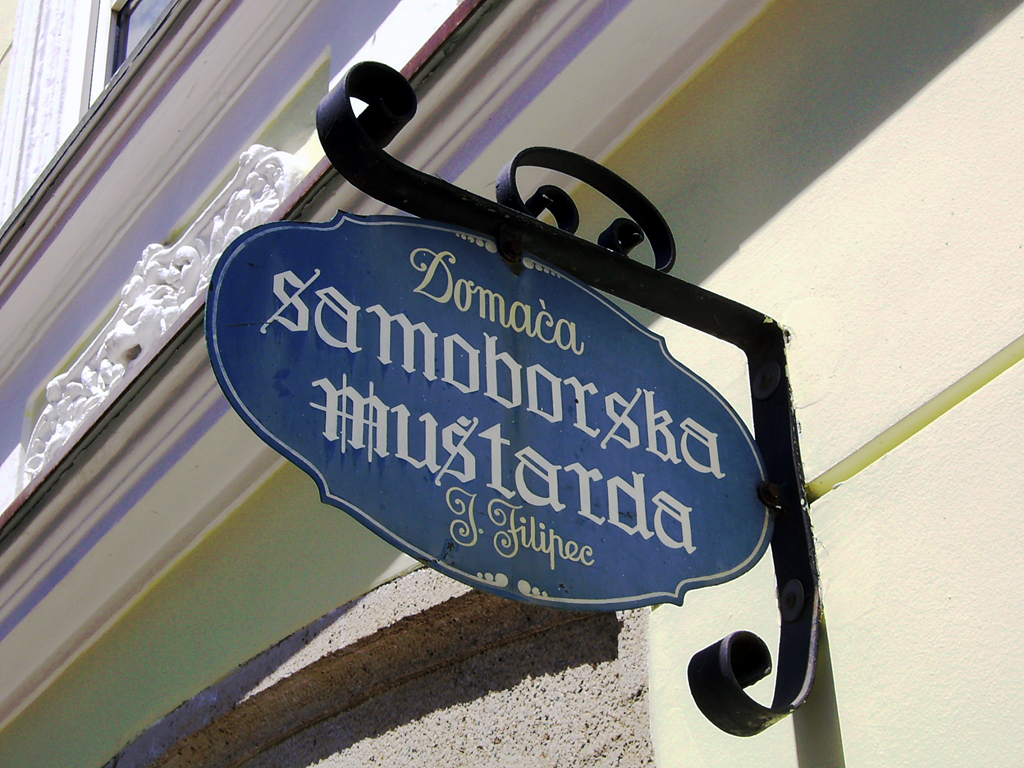
- Top: Samobor aerial view; Center left: Samobor Fountain; Center right: Main Square; Bottom left: Gradna; Bottom right: Samobor mustard sign
- Interactive map of Samobor
- Location of Samobor within Croatia
- Coordinates: 45°48′N 15°43′E
- Country: Croatia
- Region: Central Croatia (Prigorje)
- County: Zagreb County
- Free royal city: 1242
- Settlements: 77 settlements

Government
  - Type: Mayor-council
  - Mayor: Petra Škrobot (Fokus)
  - City Council: 21 members: Fokus (14); HSS (5); HDZ (1); SDP (1)
  - Electoral district: VI

Area
  - City: 251.5 km^{2} (97.1 sq mi)
  - Urban: 16.6 km^{2} (6.4 sq mi)
- Highest elevation: 860 m (2,820 ft)
- Lowest elevation: 127 m (417 ft)

Population (2021)
  - City: 37,435
  - Density: 148.8/km^{2} (385.5/sq mi)
  - Urban: 16,911
  - Urban density: 1,020/km^{2} (2,640/sq mi)
- Time zone: UTC+1 (CET)
  - Summer (DST): UTC+2 (CEST)
- Postal code: HR-10 430
- Area code: +385 1
- Vehicle registration: ZG
- Patron saints: St. Anne
- Website: samobor.hr

Samobor (pronounced [sâmɔ̝bɔ̝ːr]) is a town in Zagreb County, Croatia. It is part of the Zagreb metropolitan area.

The town is situated at the foot of the Samobor Hills along the Gradna stream, and is known for its well-preserved historic centre, Baroque architecture and picturesque natural surroundings.

Samobor is a popular excursion destination for residents of the nearby Croatian capital and renowned for its traditional kremšnita (cremeschnitte) puff pastry dessert and the annual carnival held in February.

== Geography ==
Samobor is located west of Zagreb, between the eastern slopes of the Samobor hills (Croatian: Samoborsko gorje), the eastern part of Žumberak Mountains, in the Sava River valley. It is part of the historical region of Croatia proper.

== Climate ==
Since records began in 1981, the highest temperature recorded at the local weather station was 39.0 °C (102.2 °F), on 24 August 2012. The coldest temperature was −25.6 °C (−14.1 °F), on 12 January 1985.

Climate data for Samobor
Month	Jan	Feb	Mar	Apr	May	Jun	Jul	Aug	Sep	Oct	Nov	Dec	Year
Mean daily maximum °C (°F)	4.9 (40.8)	7.7 (45.9)	12.8 (55.0)	17.7 (63.9)	22.1 (71.8)	26.6 (79.9)	28.6 (83.5)	28.4 (83.1)	22.6 (72.7)	17.4 (63.3)	11.0 (51.8)	5.7 (42.3)	17.1 (62.8)
Daily mean °C (°F)	1.1 (34.0)	3.1 (37.6)	7.2 (45.0)	12.0 (53.6)	16.6 (61.9)	21.0 (69.8)	22.8 (73.0)	22.3 (72.1)	17.0 (62.6)	12.1 (53.8)	7.2 (45.0)	2.3 (36.1)	12.1 (53.7)
Mean daily minimum °C (°F)	−2.1 (28.2)	−1.1 (30.0)	2.0 (35.6)	6.7 (44.1)	11.2 (52.2)	15.4 (59.7)	17.2 (63.0)	16.8 (62.2)	12.2 (54.0)	8.0 (46.4)	3.9 (39.0)	−0.6 (30.9)	7.5 (45.4)
Average precipitation mm (inches)	51.5 (2.03)	57.8 (2.28)	57.0 (2.24)	68.4 (2.69)	88.7 (3.49)	75.5 (2.97)	72.0 (2.83)	77.3 (3.04)	97.6 (3.84)	76.9 (3.03)	78.7 (3.10)	62.7 (2.47)	864.1 (34.01)
Source: Weather.Directory

== Administration ==
The city government, court, police, health service, and a post office are part of the Samobor infrastructure.

== History ==
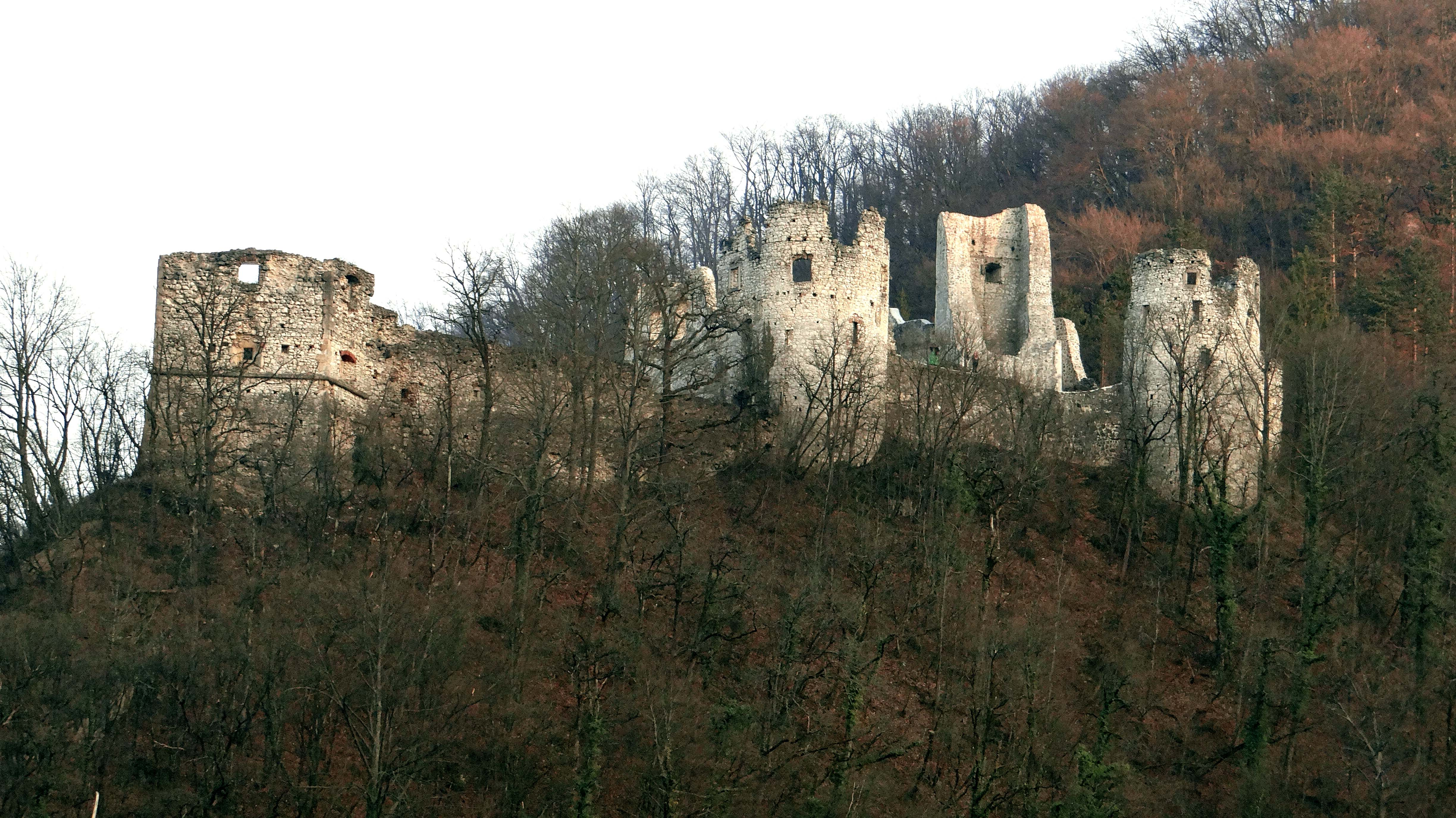
Ruins of Samobor Castle

Samobor has existed as a free royal town since 1242, (Note: Treasures of Yugoslavia states "granted free trading rights before 1242".) according to a document of endowment by King Béla IV.

Since the Treaty of Karlowitz in 1699, Szamobor was part of the Habsburg monarchy, (Transleithania after the compromise of 1867), and soon after in the Kingdom of Croatia-Slavonia, created when the Kingdom of Slavonia and the Kingdom of Croatia were merged in 1868. In the late 19th and early 20th century, Samobor was a district capital in the Zagreb County of the Kingdom of Croatia-Slavonia.

The DVD "Chromos" was founded in 1954, under the VZ grada Samobora.

== Economy ==
Crystal cutting is one of Samobor's primary industries, with its products exported internationally.

== Notable people ==
Many well-known people were born or lived in Samobor. Such notable personalities are:

- Mihalj Šilobod Bolšić (1724–1787), Roman Catholic priest, mathematician, writer, and musical theorist primarily known for writing the first Croatian arithmetic textbook Arithmatika Horvatzka (published in Zagreb, 1758)
- Tvrtko Kale (born 1974), Croatian-Israeli footballer
- Ferdo Livadić, a prominent member of the nationalist Illyrian movement in the 19th century, piano composer and writer of the most famous Croatian patriotic song (Croatian: budnica) of the 19th century, Još Hrvatska ni propala (lit. 'Croatia Hasn't Perished Yet')
- Antun Gustav Matoš, poet and writer, lived in Samobor for four years
- Antonio Šančić, tennis player
- Dejan Jović, political scientist
- Slađan Ašanin, football player
- Vladimir Šujster, handball player, olympic gold medalist Atlanta 1996

== Population ==
Historical population
Year	Pop.	±%
1857	13,690	—
1869	15,226	+11.2%
1880	16,548	+8.7%
1890	18,607	+12.4%
1900	18,783	+0.9%
1910	20,275	+7.9%
1921	19,806	−2.3%
1931	21,953	+10.8%
1948	23,821	+8.5%
1953	25,451	+6.8%
1961	27,103	+6.5%
1971	28,469	+5.0%
1981	32,887	+15.5%
1991	35,017	+6.5%
2001	36,206	+3.4%
2011	37,633	+3.9%
2021	37,435	−0.5%
Source: Naselja i stanovništvo Republike Hrvatske 1857–2021, DZS

In the 2021 Croatian census, the total population of the administrative territory of Samobor was 37,481, distributed in the following settlements:

=== Settlements ===
- Beder, population 68
- Bobovica, population 258
- Braslovje, population 303
- Bratelji, population 11
- Bregana, population 2,207
- Breganica, population 59
- Brezovac Žumberački, population 20
- Budinjak, population 10
- Bukovje Podvrško, population 25
- Celine Samoborske, population 327
- Cerje Samoborsko, population 339
- Cerovica, population 4
- Dane, population 7
- Dolec Podokićki, population 77
- Domaslovec, population 900
- Draganje Selo, population 77
- Dragonoš, population 13
- Drežnik Podokićki, population 246
- Dubrava Samoborska, population 248
- Falašćak, population 108
- Farkaševec Samoborski, population 467
- Galgovo, population 699
- Golubići, population 6
- Gornja Vas, population 22
- Gradna, population 542
- Grdanjci, population 320
- Gregurić Breg, population 106
- Hrastina Samoborska, population 852
- Jarušje, population 47
- Javorek, population 39
- Kladje, population 892
- Klake, population 230
- Klokočevec Samoborski, population 326
- Konšćica, population 267
- Kostanjevec Podvrški, population 69
- Kotari, population 74
- Kravljak, population 2
- Lug Samoborski, population 946
- Mala Jazbina, population 489
- Mala Rakovica, population 609
- Mali Lipovec, population 110
- Manja Vas, population 76
- Medsave, population 205
- Molvice, population 666
- Noršić Selo, population 90
- Novo Selo Žumberačko, population 18
- Osredek Žumberački, population 13
- Osunja, population 7
- Otruševec, population 295
- Pavučnjak, population 515
- Petkov Breg, population 256
- Podgrađe Podokićko, population 137
- Podvrh, population 520
- Poklek, population 20
- Prekrižje Plešivičko, population 16
- Rakov Potok, population 1,093
- Rude, population 1,085
- Samobor, population 16,914
- Samoborski Otok, population 612
- Savršćak, population 214
- Selce Žumberačko, population 3
- Sječevac, population 8
- Slani Dol, population 171
- Slapnica, population 11
- Slavagora, population 72
- Smerovišće, population 108
- Stojdraga, population 48
- Sveti Martin pod Okićem, population 256
- Šimraki, population 5
- Šipački Breg, population 33
- Tisovac Žumberački, population 0
- Velika Jazbina, population 263
- Velika Rakovica, population 507
- Veliki Lipovec, population 73
- Višnjevec Podvrški, population 30
- Vratnik Samoborski, population 93
- Vrbovec Samoborski, population 262
- Vrhovčak, population 365
City of Samobor: Population trends 1857–2021
v

population	13690	15226	16548	18607	18783	20275	19806	21953	23821	25451	27103	28469	32887	35017	36206	37633	37435
	1857	1869	1880	1890	1900	1910	1921	1931	1948	1953	1961	1971	1981	1991	2001	2011	2021

Sources: Croatian Bureau of Statistics publications

== Governance ==
Representatives of Samobor at the Croatian Parliament:

- Hinko Francisci (1872–1878)

== Monuments and sightseeings ==
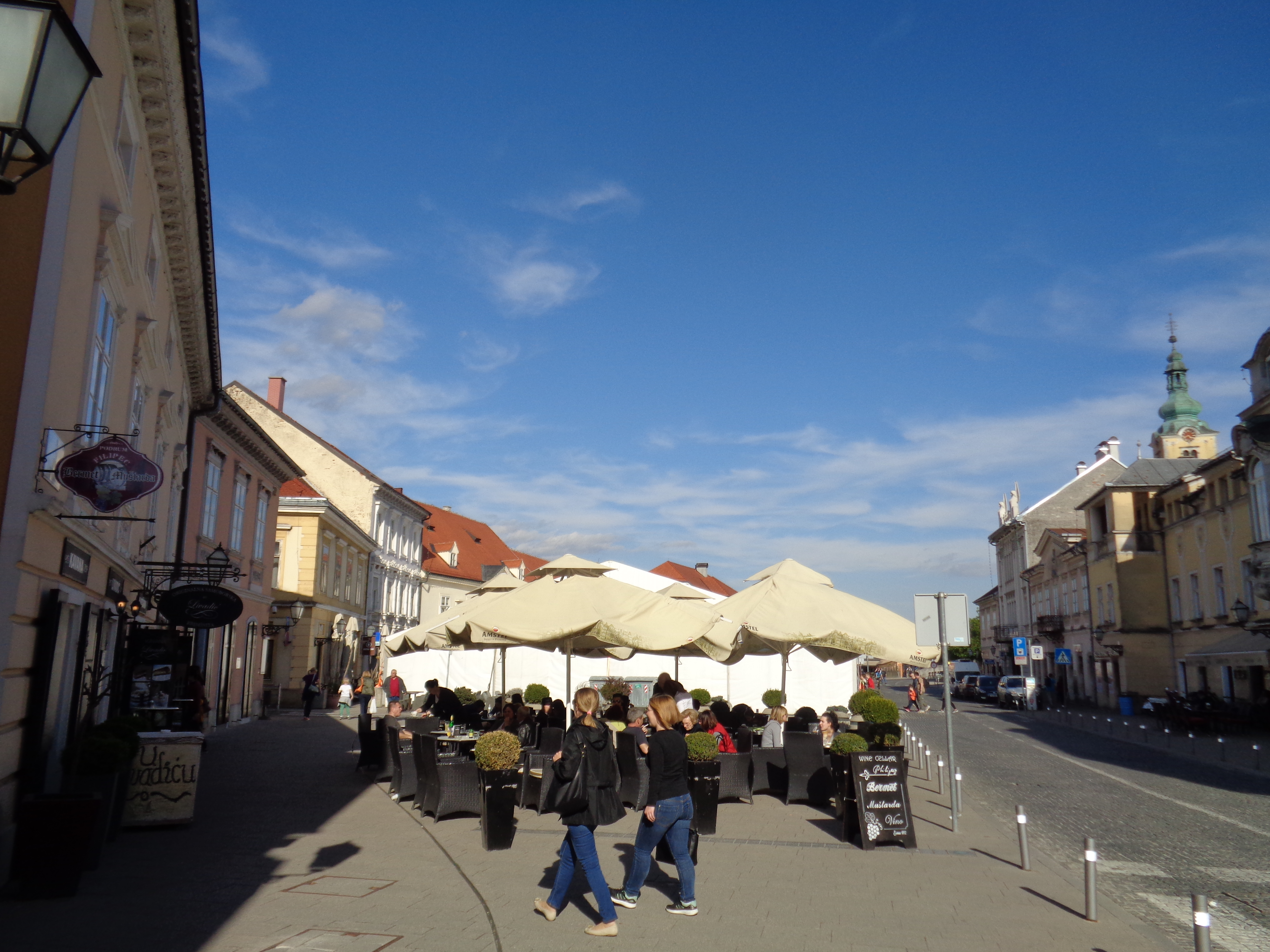
King Tomislav Square

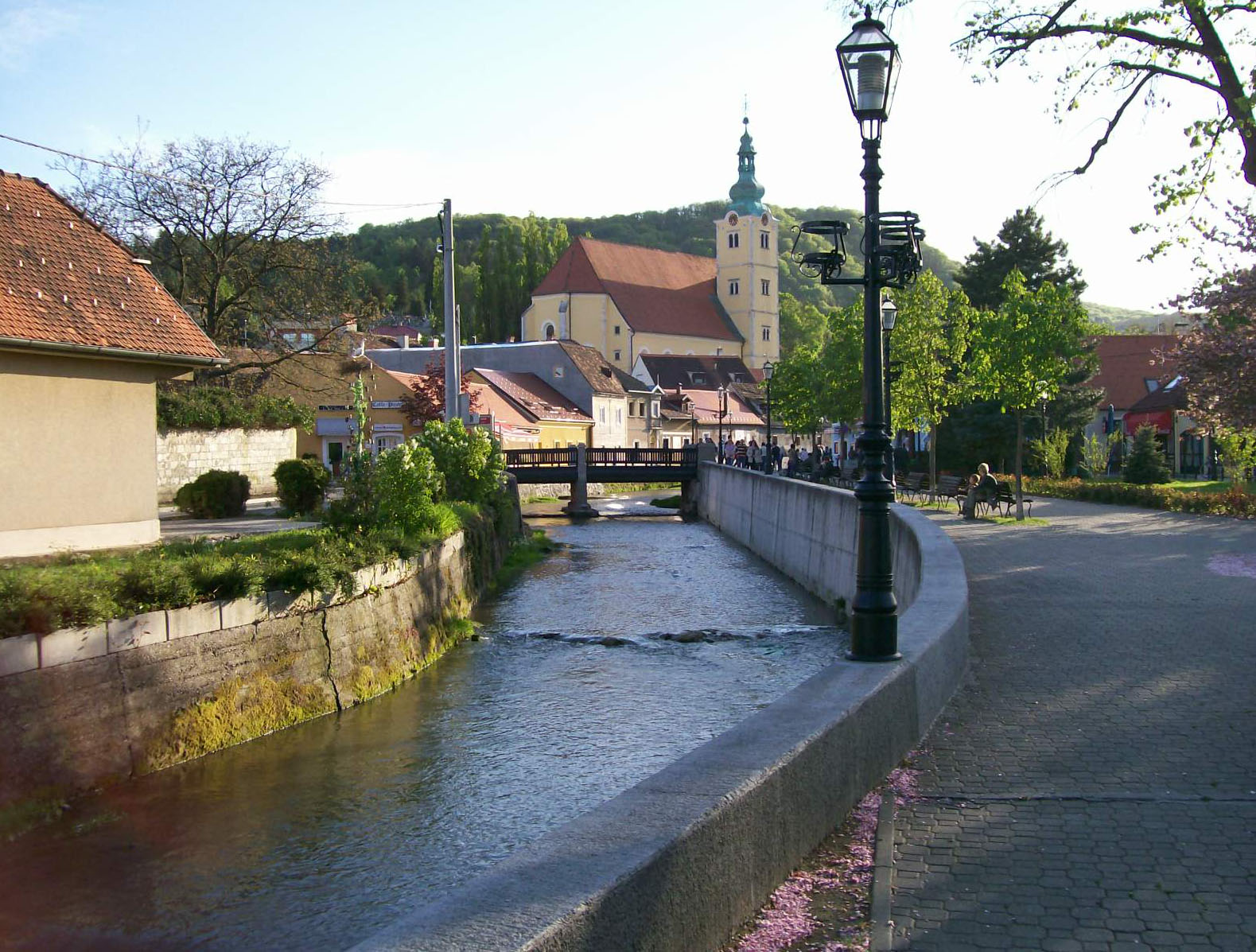
View of Gradna River

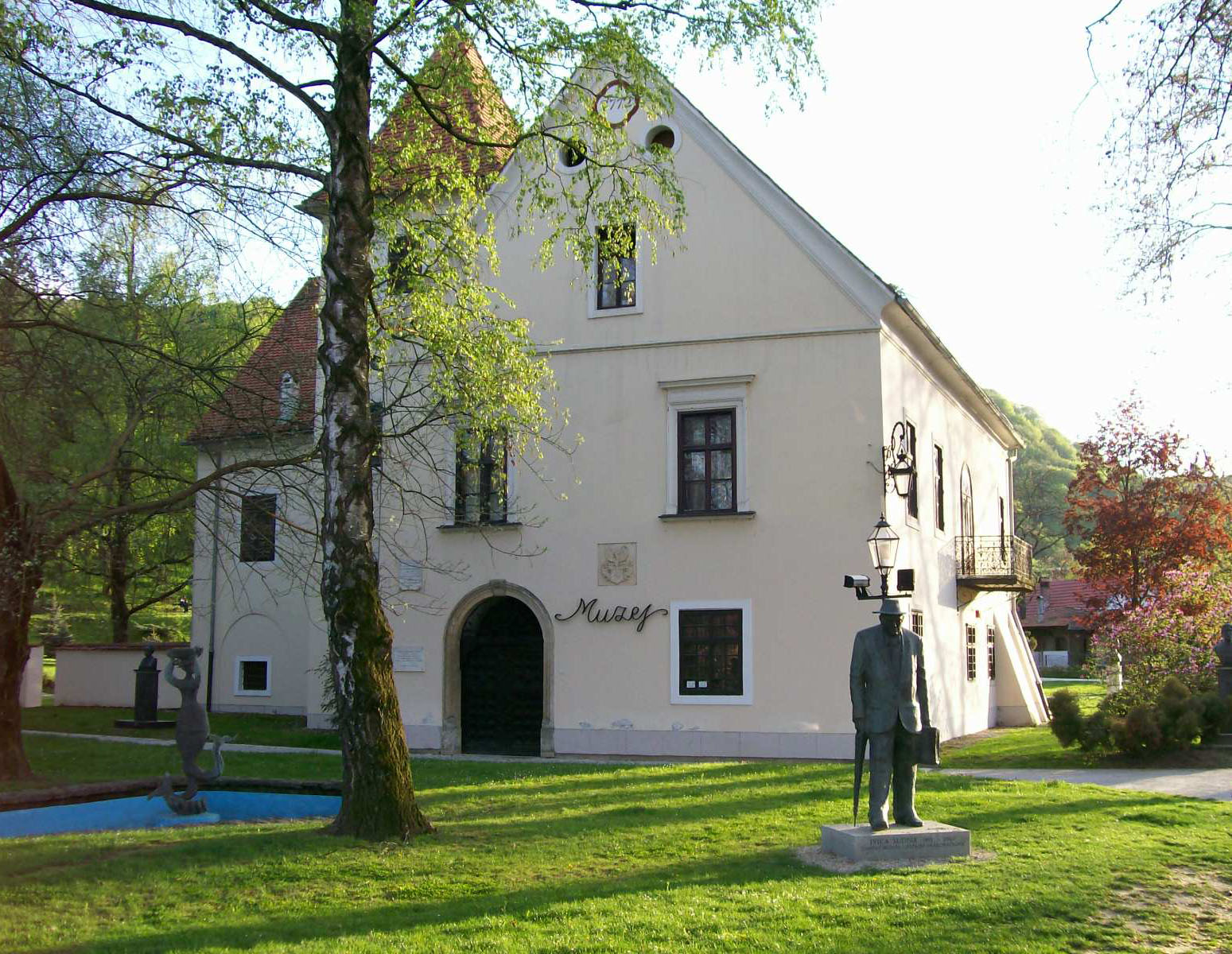
Samobor Museum

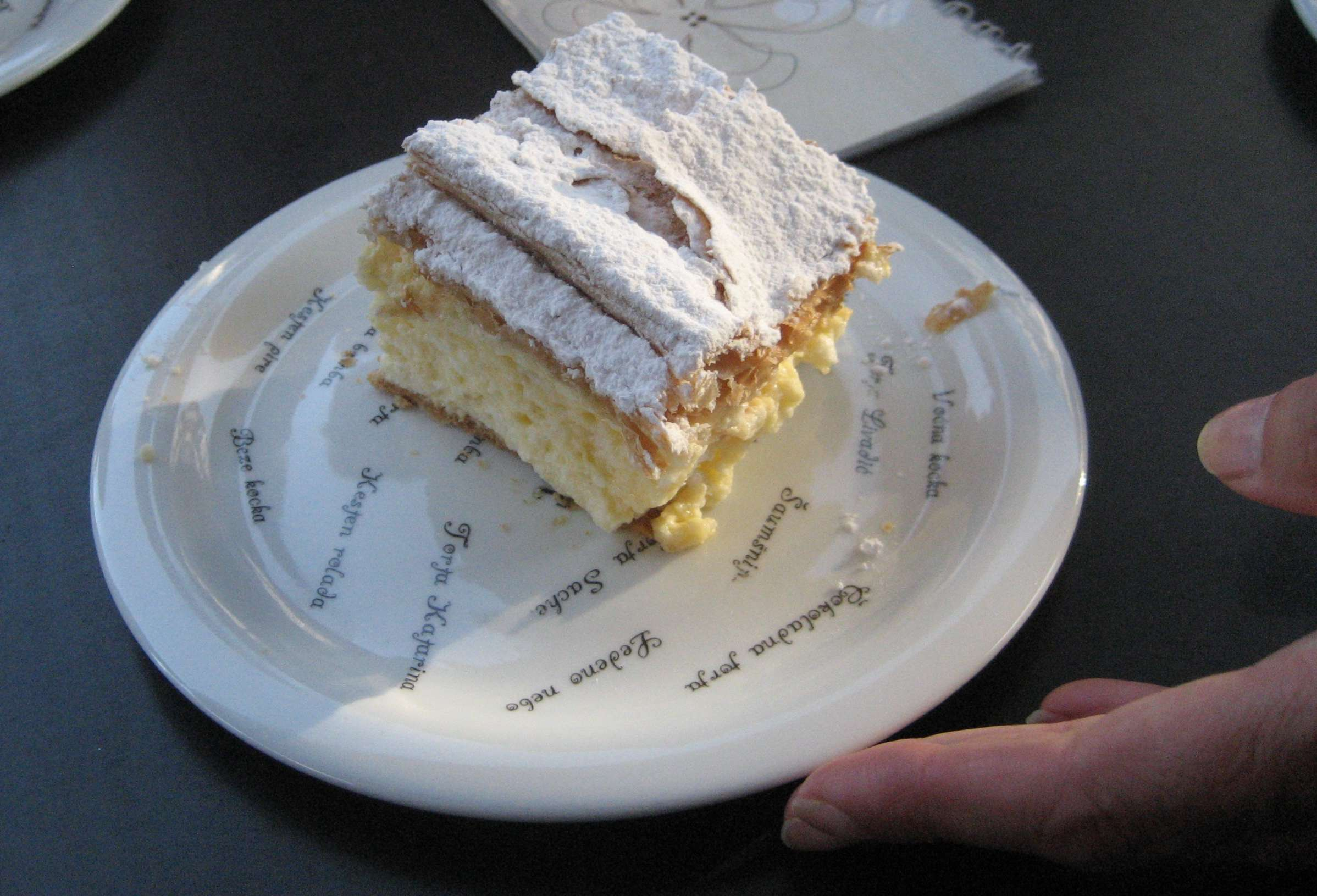
Samoborska kremšnita

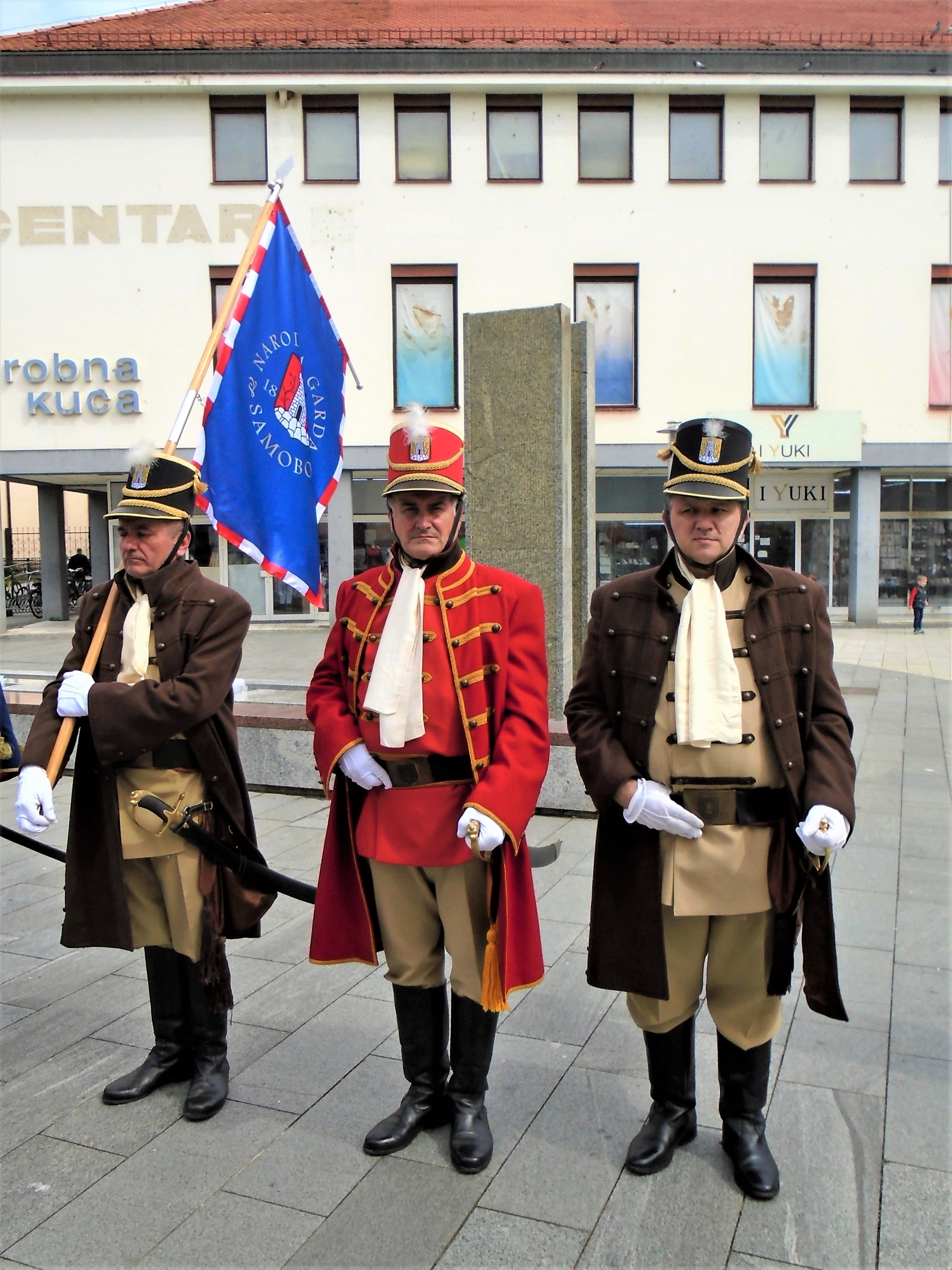
Members of the "Samobor People's Guard", a historical military unit from Samobor

Samobor is one of the earliest tourist resorts in the region, with the first tourist facilities dating back to 1810, catering to anglers, hunters and hikers. The town's beautiful surroundings and vicinity to the capital have supported this tourist tradition to the present day. In 1846, Samobor was paid a visit by the composer Franz Liszt, who at that time was visiting Zagreb during one of his numerous concert tours. Liszt came to Samobor to see his friend Ferdo Livadić, in his lodgings at the Livadić mansion, which is today the town museum. At the beginning of the 20th century, the Livadić mansion came under the ownership of a Jewish family named Daničić. They were forced to leave as a result of the Nazi invasion in 1941. Shortly after this, the mansion was confiscated by the newly formed Independent State of Croatia and never returned to the Daničić family. On Tepec hill, a 10-minute walk from the city centre, there are still-visible remains of the Samobor Castle fortress built in the 13th century.

== Education ==
These elementary schools and high schools exist in Samobor:

- Bogumil Toni Elementary School
- Samobor Elementary School (formerly the Janko Mišić Elementary School)
- Samobor High School, consisting of two academies teaching arts such as economy and trade
- the Antun Gustav Matoš Gymnasium (comprehensive school)
- Vocational High School Samobor, with technical studies, hairdressing, etc.
- Ferdo Livadić Music School, a music academy with both elementary and high school programmes

== Sport ==
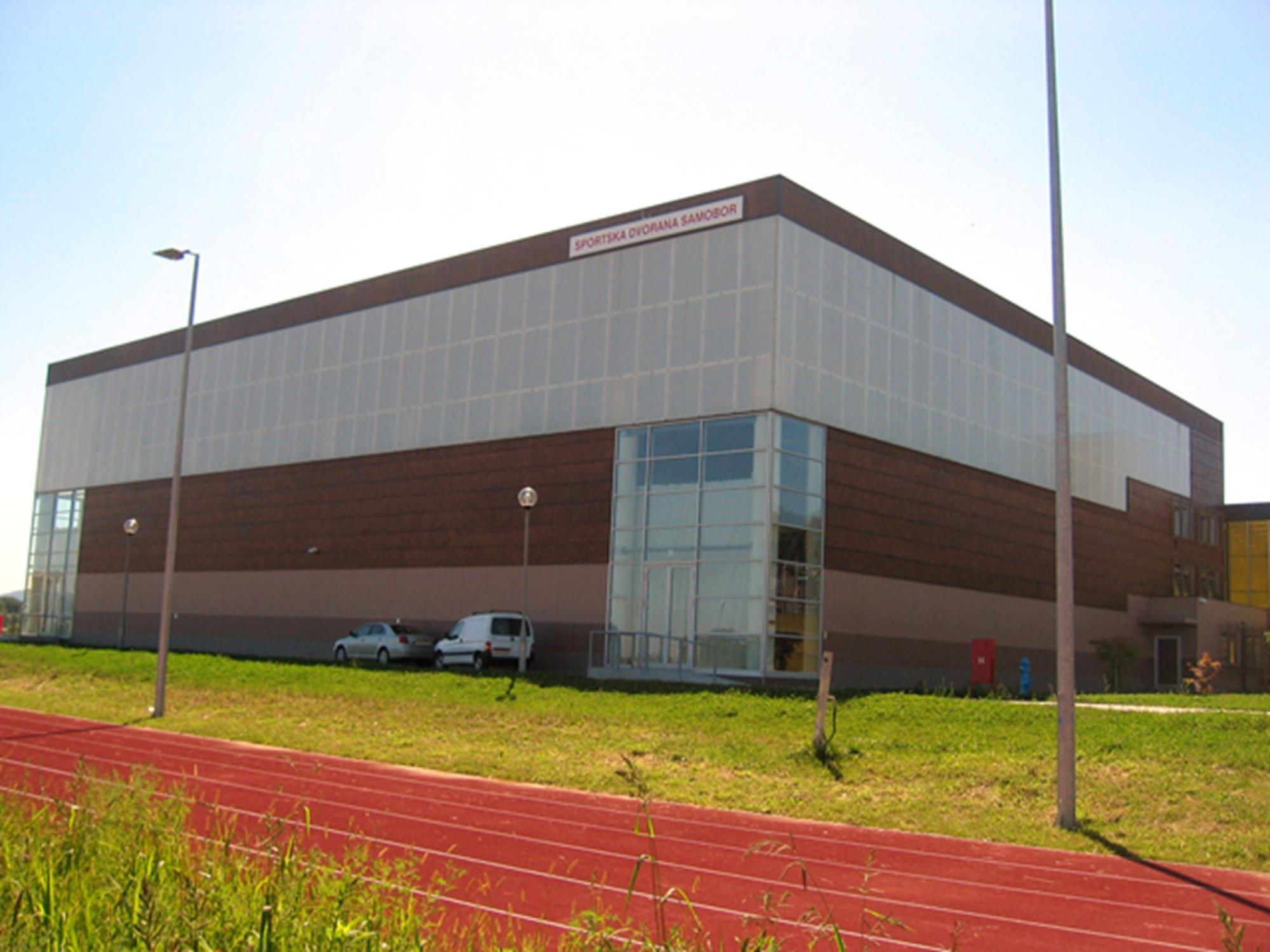
Sportska dvorana Samobor

The main local football club is NK Samobor, who play in the Treća HNL. Other football clubs are NK Bregana, NK Galgovo, NK Klokočevac, NK Rakov Potok, NK Samoborski Otok, NK Zrinski Farkaševac. The local woman's handball club is ŽRK Samobor, who play in the Prva HRL. The local men's handball clubs are RK Mladost 09, and RK Rudar, who play in the Premijer liga. The local men's basketball club is KK Samobor, who play in the Prva muška liga. The local judo clubs are Judo Klub Samobor, and Judo Klub Profectus Samobor. The local karate clubs are Karate klub Samobor, Karate klub Mladost and Karate klub Bregana. The local athletics club is Atletski klub Samobor 2007. The local gymnastics club Gimnastički klub Samobor. The local volleyball club is Odbojkaški klub Samobor. The local tennis club is Tenis klub Samobor 1890. The local table tennis club is Stolnoteniski klub Samobor. The local taekwondo club is Taekwondo klub Koryo Samobor. The local mountain bike club is Brdsko-biciklistički klub Šišmiš. The local kickboxing klub is TNT Samobor. The local motocross club is Moto Cross Klub TRP Marović.

The main football ground is Gradski Stadion Samobor. The main indoor sports hall is Sportska dvorana Samobor with the seating capacity of 700. Other indoor sports halls are Sportska dvorana Bogumil Toni with seating capacity of 500, Sportska dvorana Rude with seating capacity of 300 and Sportska dvorana OŠ Samobor with no seating capacity.

The local chapter of the HPS is HPD "Japetić", which had 253 members in 1936 under the Franjo Flašar presidency, being one of the largest within the society. At the time, it had a ski section. Membership fell to 245 in 1937. Membership rose to 246 in 1938.

== International relations ==
=== Twin towns — Sister cities ===
Samobor is twinned with:

- Wirges, Germany
- Veles, North Macedonia
- Stari Grad, Croatia
- Pécs, Hungary
- Chassieu, France
- Parabiago, Italy
