= Trevelyon Miscellany of 1608 =

- Folger Shakespeare Library
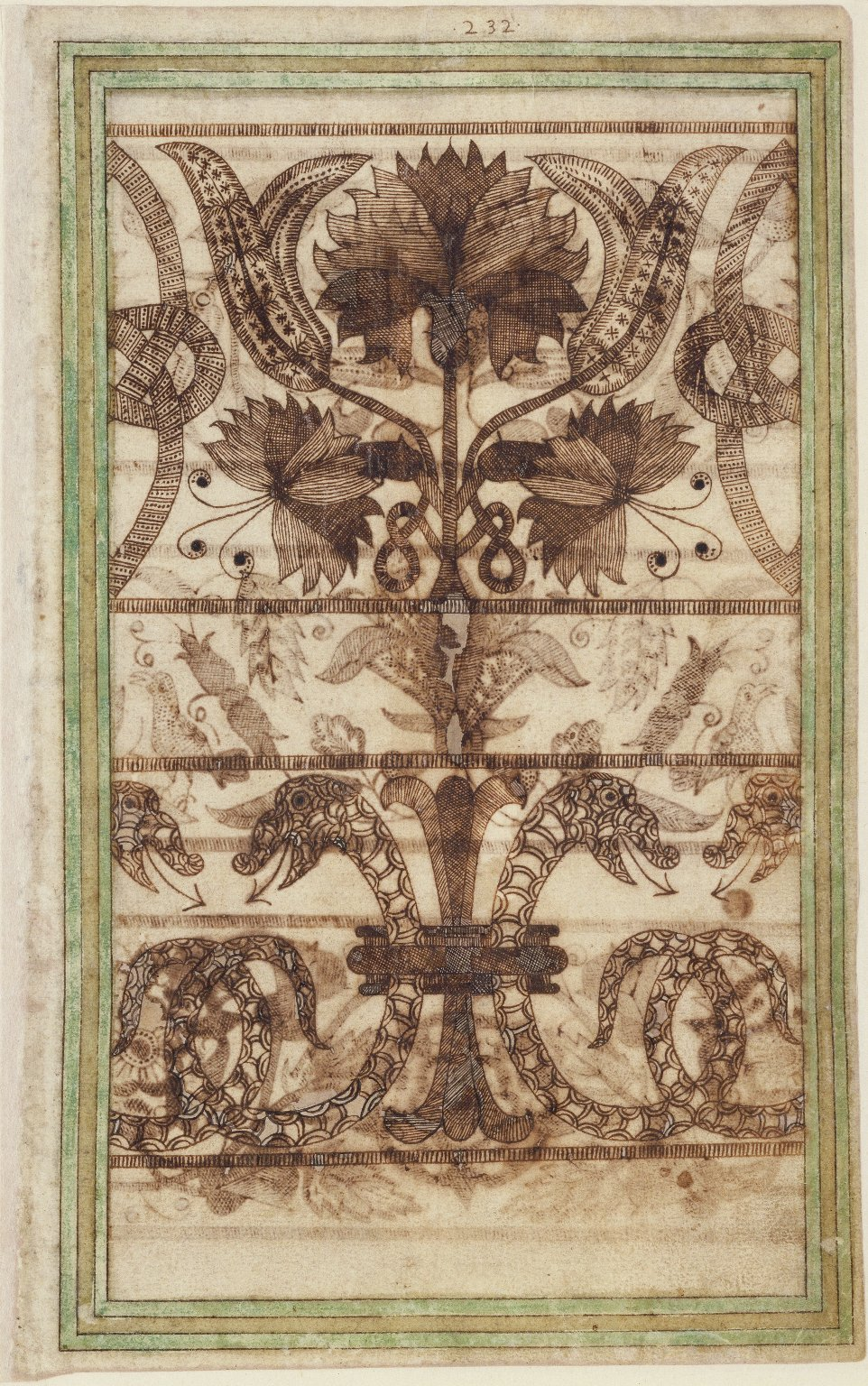
- A pattern page from the Trevelyon Miscellany of 1608
- Type: Miscellany
- Date: 1608
- Place of origin: London, England
- Language(s): English
- Compiled by: Thomas Trevelyon
- Material: Ink and paint on paper
- Accession: Folger Shakespeare Library MS V.b.232

The Trevelyon Miscellany of 1608, compiled by Thomas Trevelyon in London, England in 1608, is an illustrated manuscript miscellany containing handwritten notes and drawings (many hand-colored) on historical, religious, social and practical themes, adapted from a variety of sources, including the Bible and ancient and contemporary English writers. According to Dr. Heather Wolfe, Curator of Manuscripts and Archivist at the Folger Shakespeare Library, "the primary purposes of the Trevelyon miscellany ... are didactic and mnemonic. The extracts and examples from secular, allegorical, and Protestant texts are an enduring monument for improving one's moral conduct in this life and preparing for the next."

The Trevelyon Miscellany of 1608, also known as Folger Shakespeare Library MS V.b.232, was given to the Folger Shakespeare Library by Lessing J. Rosenwald in 1945.

Trevelyon later compiled another manuscript miscellany with some of the same illustrations, now owned by the library at Wormsley Park. An earlier manuscript miscellany (circa 1603) at University College London was identified in 2012 as also being the work of Trevelyon.

== Contents ==
The Trevelyon Miscellany of 1608 contains five parts

- Part 1. (Leaves 3-36) Historical and practical information, with a timeline, calendar, proverbs, computational tables, astronomical diagrams, a genealogy of the families of William the Conqueror, and geographical data
- Part 2. (Leaves 37-126r) Biblical chronology and genealogy; lists of British kings and queens
- Part 3. (Leaves 126v-213) Biblical and secular verses, parables, and lists, with illustrations
- Part 4. (Leaves 215-307, 310v, 311v, 312v) Chiefly illustrated patterns for embroidery, needlework, woodwork, and other applied arts
- Part 5. (Leaves 308-327) A list of sheriffs and mayors of London from 1190-1601

Many of the hand-drawn illustrations by Trevelyon were based on published woodcuts and engravings.

According to the Folgerpedia website, "The Miscellany is probably best known today for its embroidery patterns, which make up nearly one hundred pages of the volume."

== Exhibitions ==
The Trevelyon Miscellany of 1608 has been featured in several Folger Shakespeare Library exhibitions, including:

- Word & Image: The Trevelyon Miscellany of 1608, January 23 - May 22, 2004
- Noyses, Sounds, and Sweet Aires, 2006
- Time, the Greatest Innovator, 1986-1987
- Letterwriting in Renaissance England, 2004-2005
- Elizabeth I, 2003
- Fooles and Fricassees, 1999
