= U to vrijeme godišta =

Croatian Christmas carol

U to vrijeme godišta (Va se vrime godišća in older sources, English: "In that time of year") is a Croatian Christmas carol. In its original form, it consists of approximately 30 stanzas, but is shortened in more recent versions to as little as 4. The song enjoys particular popularity in Dalmatia.

== History ==
The basis for the first version is speculated to have been derived from a translation of an 11th-century Latin cantinela In hoc anni circulo. However, it was later proven that the text of the final redaction most likely developed from the Christmas liturgical play and the sight of the Biblical Magi was only preserved in the glagolitic writing from the 15th century.

The first version of Va se vrime godišća is found in the c. 1400-1450 Glagolithic Beram missal from Istria, originally written in the scriptorium of Bartol Krbavac. It was also recorded in the 1468 Petris miscellany from the island of Krk. From there, it gradually spread to Dalmatia, and then north, to Slavonia, being recorded in Pavlinski zbornik from 1644, and Cithara octochorda (18th century).

== Lyrics ==
The most recent version (Štokavian), dating from 1934:

U to vrijeme godišta
Mir se svijetu naviješta
Porođenjem Djetešca
Kom' je majka djevica.
Anđeli se javili
Rajsku pjesmu slagali
Slava Bogu pjevali
A mir ljud'ma prosili.
Djeva Sina rodila
Đavlu silu slomila
Svijetu Spasa podala
Nama majka postala.
A mi Kristu hvalimo
S anđelima pjevamo
Radi žrtve njegove
Što je za nas započe.

Cithara octochorda, 1757 (Kajkavian), printed in Zagreb:

Vu to vreme godiʃcha,
mir ʃze ʃzvetu nazveʃcha:
porogyenye Kriʃtuʃʃa,
po Devicze Marie.
Od Mayke Divoychicze,
te nebezke Kralicze:
zide dete z-vutrobe
blagoʃzlovne Marie.
Opol nochi porodi, nebo,
zemlyu preʃzveti:
kak opoldan ʃzveto be,
po porodu Marie.
Gda Bog v-jaʃzle leʃaʃʃe,
Matimuʃze klanyaʃʃe:
miloga obimaʃʃe,
à Devamu Mat' beʃʃe.
Angeli mu ʃzlusahu,
nove peʃzmi zpevahu:
milozt nyegvu proʃzahu
da bu chlovek vu raju.
Hvala Bogu viʃʃayemu,
y Gozponu naʃʃemu:
Gozponu mirovnomu,
Szinu Deve dragomu.
Vʃze na ʃszvetu ztvorenye,
vezda ima veʃzelye:
za JEʃuʃʃa rogyenye,
od prechizte Marie.
Arʃze na ʃzvet narodi,
ki moch vrasju pogubi:
greʃʃnike oʃzlobodi,
JEʃus Kriʃtus Szin Boʃy.
Komu hvala, y dika,
po vʃzem ʃzvetu velika:
nayʃze hvali y nyegva
Mayka Deva Maria, Amen.

== Melody ==
There are several versions of the melody, of which the most widely used one is from Dubrovnik. Musical historians noted a similarity of this particular melody with a pastorale by Italian composer Girolamo Frescobaldi, noting the melody had outside influences, however it was subsequently dismissed as a coincidence.
