= Novo Selo Okićko =

- Settlement
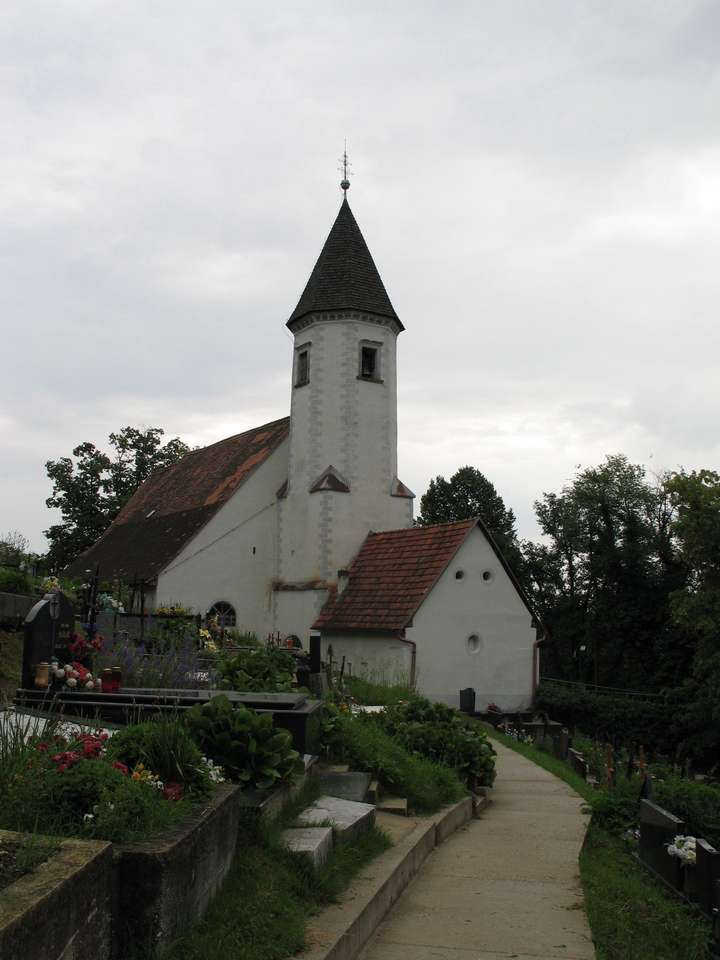
- Church of Rođenja Blažene Djevice Marije in Novo Selo Okićko

- Location within Croatia
- Coordinates: 45.72°N 15.72°E
- Country: Croatia
- County: Zagreb
- City: Samobor

Area
  - Total: 2.4 km^{2} (0.93 sq mi)

Population (2021)
  - Total: 112
  - Density: 47/km^{2} (120/sq mi)
- Time zone: UTC+1 (CET)
  - Summer (DST): UTC+2 (CEST)

Novo Selo Okićko is a settlement (naselje) in the Samobor administrative territory of Zagreb County, Croatia. As of 2021 it had a population of 112 people.

== Name ==
Its appellation Okićko comes from its location near Okić.

== History ==
=== Deed of Mavar Fabjanić ===
On 2 November 1505, Mavar Fabjanić sold a meadow to Mate Štefanić. The Glagolitic deed, eventually acquired by Ivan Kukuljević Sakcinski, was written by Paval, parish priest of Sv. Marija below Okić:

ⰮⰋ ⰆⰖⰒⰀⰐ ⰡⰐⰄⰓⰋ, ⰄⰓⰃⰀⰐⰔⰍⰋ ⰆⰖⰒⰀⰐ, ... Ⰲ ⰔⰕⰀⰐⰍⰑⰂⰋ, ⰄⰀⰮⰑ ⰐⰀ ⰈⰐⰀⰐⰅ ⰂⰔⰀⰍⰑⰮⰖ Ⰻ ⰂⰔⰀⰍⰅ ⰂⰓⰔⰕⰅ ⰄⰑⰁⰓⰑⰮⰬ ⰎⰖⰄⰅⰮ, ⰄⰀ ⰒⰓⰋⰄⰅ ⰒⰓⰅⰄ ⰐⰀⰔ ⰒⰑ ⰋⰮⰅⰐⰋ ⰮⰂⰓⰬ ⰗⰁⰡⰐⰛ, ⰒⰓⰅⰔⰅⰛⰋ ⰍⰮⰅⰕⰀ ⰒⰑⰐⰖⰄⰋⰕⰬ ⰮⰑⰅ ⰔⰕⰓⰝⰋⰛⰅ ⰁⰎⰋⰆⰐⰅ Ⰻ ⰄⰀⰂⰐⰅ (ⰕⰀⰍⰑ) Ⰻ ⰔⰖⰔⰅⰄⰅ ⰮⰑⰅ ⰔⰕⰀⰐⰍⰑⰂⰜⰅ ⰮⰑⰣ ⰐⰋⰂⰖ ⰔⰎⰁⰑⰄⰐⰖ Ⰲ ⰌⰎⰔⰋ ⰒⰑ ⰋⰮⰅⰐⰋ ⰎⰖⰍⰖ. ⰐⰋⰃⰄⰓ ⰔⰅ ⰐⰅⰐⰀⰋⰄⰅ ⰐⰅⰃⰑ ⰮⰀⰕⰅ ⰞⰕⰅⰗⰀⰐⰋⰛ ⰔⰂⰑⰋⰮⰀ ⰔⰋⰐⰮⰀ ⰍⰋⰓⰋⰐⰑⰮ Ⰻ ⰗⰎⰋⰒⰑⰮ. ... Ⰻ ⰒⰓⰋ ⰕⰑⰋ ⰜⰅⰐⰋ ⰁⰋⰞⰅ ⰑⰎⰄⰑⰮⰀⰞⰐⰋⰜⰋ ⰄⰑⰁⰓⰋ ⰮⰖⰆⰋ: ⰐⰀⰋⰒⰓⰂⰑ ⰎⰑⰂⰓⰅⰐⰀⰜ ⰝⰓⰐⰍⰑⰂⰋⰛ, ⰍⰋ ⰈⰂⰀ ⰑⰎⰄⰑⰮⰀⰞ, Ⰻ ⰓⰑⰍ ⰗⰁⰡⰐⰋⰛ, ⰮⰀⰓⰕⰋⰐ ⰗⰁⰡⰐⰋⰛ, ⰍⰋ Ⰵ Ⰲ ⰈⰀⰃⰓⰅⰁⰋ, ⰂⰀⰎⰅⰐⰕ ⰗⰁⰡⰐⰋⰛ, ⰡⰐⰄⰓⰋ ⰗⰁⰡⰐⰋⰛ, ⰀⰕⰅ ⰐⰑⰂⰀⰝⰋⰛ, ⰗⰁⰡⰐ ⰐⰑⰂⰀⰝⰋⰛ, ...ⰅⰍ ⰐⰑⰂⰀⰝⰋⰛ, ⰋⰂⰀⰐⰖⰞ ⰞⰒⰀⰐⰋⰛ, ⰮⰀⰓⰍⰑ ⰔⰕⰀⰐⰀⰝⰋⰛ, ⰡⰐⰄⰓⰋ ⰍⰑⰎⰄⰋⰐⰋⰛ, ⰡⰐⰕⰑⰎⰬ Ⰻ ⰍⰋⰓⰋⰐⰬ ⰞⰕⰅⰗⰀⰐⰋⰛ. Ⰻ ⰕⰋ ⰑⰎⰄⰑⰮⰀⰞⰐⰋⰜⰋ ⰒⰑⰔⰕⰀⰂⰋⰞⰅ ⰈⰀⰃⰑⰂⰑⰓ ·Ⰻ· Ⰻ ·Ⰴ· ⰃⰓⰋⰂⰀⰐ ⰃⰑⰔⰐⰖ, ⰕⰑⰎⰋⰍⰑⰌ ⰒⰓⰑⰕⰂⰐⰋ, ⰍⰋ ⰁⰋ ⰕⰑ ⰒⰑⰓⰅⰍⰀⰎⰬ; Ⰰ ⰜⰅⰐⰀ ⰄⰀ Ⰵ ⰕⰂⰓⰄⰀ. ⰑⰄ ⰋⰕⰬ ⰕⰅ ⰎⰖⰍⰅ ·Ⰱ· ⰁⰅⰝⰀ. Ⰻ ⰀⰈⰬ ⰮⰀⰕⰅ ⰞⰕⰅⰗⰀⰐⰛ Ⱄ ⰮⰑⰋⰮⰀ ⰔⰋⰐⰮⰀ ⰂⰋⰞⰅ ⰓⰅⰝⰅⰐⰋⰮⰀ ⰕⰖ ⰜⰅⰐⰖ ⰄⰑⰔⰒⰎⰀⰕⰋⰘ ⰄⰑ ⰔⰑⰎⰄⰋⰐⰀ ⰮⰀⰂⰓⰖ ⰗⰁⰡⰐⰋⰛⰖ. ⰒⰓⰋ ⰕⰑⰋ ⰒⰎⰀⰛⰋ ⰁⰋⰞⰅ ⰄⰑⰁⰓⰋ ⰮⰖⰆⰋ: ⰐⰀⰋⰒⰓⰑ ⰓⰋⰘⰕⰀⰓ ⰎⰑⰂⰓⰅⰐⰀⰆⰬ ⰡⰍⰑⰂⰎⰋⰛ, ⰓⰋⰘⰕⰀⰓ ⰍⰋⰓⰋⰐ, ⰂⰓⰁⰀⰐ ⰒⰑⰕⰀⰍ, ... Ⰻ ⰀⰈ ⰄⰑⰮⰋⰐ ⰒⰀⰂⰀⰎ ⰒⰎⰋⰁⰀⰐⰖⰞ ⰔⰕⰅ ⰮⰀⰓⰋⰌⰅ ⰒⰑⰄ [Ⱁ]ⰍⰋⰛⰅⰮ, ⰍⰋ ⰕⰑ ⰒⰋⰔⰀⰘ. ⰐⰀ ⰎⰅⰕ ⰃⰑⰔⰘ ·Ⱍ·Ⱇ·Ⰴ· ⰮⰋⰔⰅⰆⰀ ⰐⰑⰂⰅⰮⰁⰓⰀ ⰄⰓⰖⰃⰋ ⰄⰀⰐ.

— Paval, plebanuš of Sv. Marije church, Acta Croatica (1863)

It is a Chakavian text, and its use of syndetic dual (svoima sinma, moima sinma, rečenima) has been studied in Kuzmić 2014, which provides a Latinic transcription.

== Demographics ==
Naselje Novo Selo Okićko: Population trends 1857–2021
v

population	104	112	130	158	158	159	137	188	168	179	182	176	155	149	121	110	112
	1857	1869	1880	1890	1900	1910	1921	1931	1948	1953	1961	1971	1981	1991	2001	2011	2021

Note:A village from 1910 on, listed as Sveta Marija Okićka until 1948. From 1857 to 1947 it includes data for the former village of Popov Dol. Sources: Croatian Bureau of Statistics publications

== Bibliography ==
- Kuzmić, Boris (2014-12-09). "Sindetična dvojina u čakavskim pravnim tekstovima od 13. do 18. stoljeća". Čakavska rič. 42 (1–2): 121–145. eISSN 1849-1081.
- Kukuljević Sakcinski, Ivan (1863). Acta Croatica: Listine Hrvatske (in Serbo-Croatian). Zagreb: Ljudevit Gaj.
