= Zvonimir Mrkonjić =

Croatian playwright, poet, and academic

Zvonimir Mrkonjić (born 1938 in Split, Croatia) is a prominent and award-winning Croatian playwright, poet and academic.

== Biography ==
Born and raised in Split, Mrkonjić moved to Zagreb after finishing high school. In 1961, he graduated with a dual degree in comparative literature and French from the University of Zagreb.

Mrkonjić also gained an interest in theatre and poetry while he was a university student. He studied directing at the Academy of Dramatic Art, University of Zagreb, as one of the last students of the famed Croatian director Branko Gavella. He would later spend several years as a playwright and director at the Gavella Drama Theatre.

Mrkonjić was an editor for Telegram (a cultural journal) and Prolog (a theatre periodical).

Mrkonjić is a member of the Croatian Writers Society. In 2006, he became a full member of the Croatian Academy of Arts and Sciences. He won the Vladimir Nazor Award for Literature in 2008.

== List of works ==
- Where is it (poem), Zagreb, 1962.
- Map (poems), Zagreb, 1964.
- Dan (poem), Split, 1968.
- SCAPE flabby (poem), Zagreb, 1970.
- The invention of infinity (literary essays), Zagreb, 1971.
- Contemporary Croatian Poetry (distribution/text), Zagreb, 1972.
- Puncta (fragments), Zagreb, 1972.
- Book changes (poem), Zagreb, 1972.
- Obviously (poems), Zagreb, 1976.
- Date (poem), Zagreb, 1977.
- Zvonjelice (poems), Zagreb, 1980.
- System and images (literary essays), Zagreb, 1980.
- Opscenacija (poems), Zagreb, 1985.
- Mirror of madness (theatrological essays), Zagreb, 1985.
- Place bread (poems), Zagreb, 1986.
- Wild God / Dieu sauvage (poems), Zagreb, 1987.
- Black Box (poem), Zagreb, 1988.
- Letters in white (poem), Zagreb, 1989.
- A state of emergency (literary essays), Zagreb, 1991.
- Put in Dalj (poems), Zagreb, 1992.
- Sipanjsko Sonnets (poems), Zagreb 1992.
- Our fantasy lover (anthology, with Hrvoje Griffin and Andrian Skunca), Zagreb, 1992.
- Sand, fog and anything (poems), Zagreb, 1996.
- As grass (poem), Zagreb, 1988.
- Anthology of French Poetry (with Borsetto), Zagreb, 1998.
- Discovering the crowd (poem), Zagreb, 2002.
- Olive in čistopisu (selected poems), Zagreb, 2004.
- Croatian poetry of the twentieth century (anthology), Zagreb, 2004.
- Sonnet Sonnets (poems), Zagreb, 2005.
- Randomize the sun, selected poems, Vinkovci 2005
- Songs and Poèmes, h, d, p, Zagreb 2006.
- Substance as memory (visual trials), Antibarbarus, Zagreb 2007.

== See also ==
- List of Croatian-language poets
