= Theological miscellany (British Library, Add MS 43460) =

British Library, Add MS 43460 is a theological miscellany and was produced in Italy in the late 8th century. It contains works by St. Augustine, St. Jerome, and Commodianus. Its title in the British Library catalogue is: Theological Works of St Augustine and St Jerome, with Commodianus, 'Carmen Apologeticum', in Latin.

== Contents ==
The works by Augustine included in this manuscript are De vera religione (folios 1r - 63r), De utilitate credendi (folios 63v - 95r), Soliloquia (folios 96r - 135v), De divinatione demonum (folios 135v - 147v) and Epistle ad Alypium episcopum Tagastensium (folios 175v -182r). The first three of these have sections of Augustine's Retractationes as prologues. Also included in the manuscript are three letters addressed to St Boniface and attributed to Augustine; Domino sublimi semperque magnifico (folio 95r), Domino merito honorabili (folio 95v) and Ego quos diligo (folio 95v). Migne labeled these letters spurious in the Patrologia Latina. The works by Jerome included in this manuscript are a portion of Liber contra Joannem Hierosolymitanum (folios 147v - 170r) and Epistle ad Evangelum Presbyterum de Melchisedech (folios 170v - 175v). The manuscript also includes the Carmen Apologeticum of Commodianus (182r- 197r). This is the only surviving manuscript to contain this work.

== Codicology ==
The manuscript has 202 vellum folios (numbered I-V and 1-197) that measure 275 mm. by 180 mm. The folios generally are in gatherings of 8 leaves each. The binding is a modern binding of white pigskin. The script is a pre-Carolingian minuscule from Northern Italy. There are a few decorated initials. Titles were added in the 9th century in a hand from the Abbey of St Silvester at Nonantola. Folios I-III are palimpsests and originally contained the Latin translation made by Mutianus Scholasticus of John Chrysostom's homilies on the Epistle to the Hebrews written in a late 7th century uncial script.

== Provenance ==
By the 9th century, this manuscript was at Nonantola. It is also possible that it was produced there. It was included in inventories of the manuscripts at Nonantola made in 1331, 1464 and 1490. It was taken from Nonantola, along with 53 other manuscripts, to the Church of Santa Croce in Gerusalemme in Rome by Abbot Hilarion Rancati. Sometime between 1798 and 1818 it, along with 34 other manuscripts, disappeared from Santa Croce. It was bought by Sir Thomas Phillipps in 1848 from a London bookseller. It was bought from the Phillipps library by Alfred Chester Beatty in 1924. It was sold to Wilfred Merton in 1933, from whom it was acquired by the British Library.
