= Drežnik Podokićki =

- Settlement
- Location within Croatia
- Country: Croatia
- County: Zagreb
- City: Samobor

Area
  - Total: 4.2 km^{2} (1.6 sq mi)

Population (2021)
  - Total: 247
  - Density: 59/km^{2} (150/sq mi)
- Time zone: UTC+1 (CET)
  - Summer (DST): UTC+2 (CEST)

Drežnik Podokićki is a settlement (naselje) in the Samobor administrative territory of Zagreb County, Croatia. As of 2011 it had a population of 253 people. Its appelative Podokićki comes from its location "below Okić".
