= Dolec Podokićki =

- Settlement
- Location within Croatia
- Country: Croatia
- County: Zagreb
- City: Samobor

Area
  - Total: 0.5 km^{2} (0.19 sq mi)

Population (2021)
  - Total: 77
  - Density: 150/km^{2} (400/sq mi)
- Time zone: UTC+1 (CET)
  - Summer (DST): UTC+2 (CEST)

Dolec Podokićki is a settlement (naselje) in the Samobor administrative territory of Zagreb County, Croatia. As of 2011 it had a population of 84 people. Its appelative Podokićki comes from its location "below Okić".
