= North French Hebrew Miscellany =

Illuminated manuscript from 13th century France

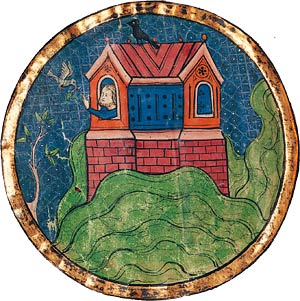
Illustration of Noah's Ark landing on the Mountains of Ararat (fol. 521a).

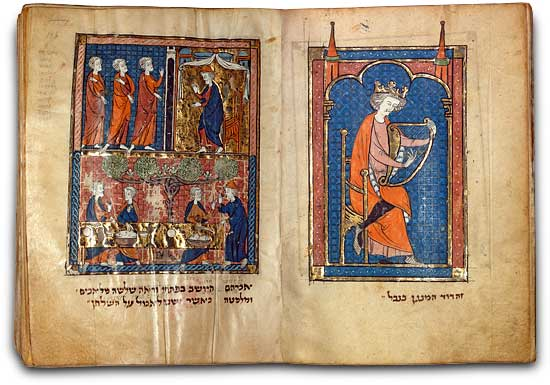
Left, scenes with Abraham from Genesis, ch 18; right, David

The North French Hebrew Miscellany or "French Miscellany" or "London Miscellany" (British Library Add. MS 11639) is an important Hebrew illuminated manuscript from 13th-century France, created c. 1278-98. A miscellany is a manuscript containing texts of different types and by different authors, and this volume contains a wide range of Hebrew language texts, mostly religious but many secular. The manuscript is exceptional among medieval Hebrew manuscripts both for its size and the diversity of the texts and the quality and lavishness of its illuminations, which as was often the case were added by Christian specialists.

This manuscript was digitized by the British Library's Hebrew Manuscripts Digitisation Project and is available online.

== Description ==
The manuscript (excluding paper flyleaves) has 746 folios (so 1,492 pages), which include a quire of six illuminated pages added at the end; the page dimensions are 16 x 12 cm. The manuscript includes "eighty-four different groups of texts, including hundreds of poems". The Biblical and liturgical texts include the Pentateuch, the Haftarot prophetical readings, Tiqqun soferim, Five Scrolls, and the full annual cycle of the liturgy, as well as the Haggadah (Passover ritual) and the earliest complete Hebrew text of the Book of Tobit, which is not included in the Tanakh or canon of the Hebrew Bible. Other texts include the Pirkei Avot, prayers, gematria, legal texts and calendars. The poetry includes a large group of poems by Moses ibn Ezra, the great Spanish Sephardic poet of the previous century. The single scribe of the texts is named (in four places) as "Benjamin", who may have compiled the book for his own use; there is no "proper colophon" as might be expected in a commissioned manuscript. Another suggestion is that the unusual number of illustrations including the biblical figure of Aaron indicate a patron with this name.

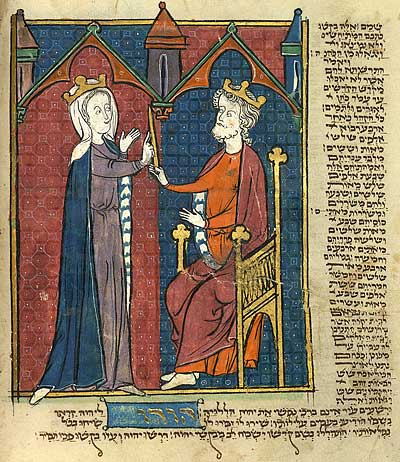
Esther before Ahasuerus.

The manuscript is illustrated with a total of 49 full-page miniatures, mostly of Biblical subjects, "which were executed by Christian illuminators attached to three major contemporary Parisian workshops", and probably also worked on at Amiens or another north French city, and reflect the latest Gothic styles, though the execution of the various artists is uneven, and one scholar complains that "broad, flat expanses of crudely painted, often runny pigment; angular, etiolated figures, and unusual colours place it well outside the orbit of the Parisian de luxe book, although its painters were undoubtedly influenced by the Parisian style".

The subjects include Jewish mythical beasts whose depiction draws on Christian bestiaries. These are mostly illustrated in roundels with a text caption beneath, while the narrative scenes from the Pentateuch are in rectangular miniatures (the scene with Noah's Ark illustrated here is an exception). There are 2 full-page diagrams in ink of the stars and planets and the signs of the zodiac (ff. 542, 542v) and "numerous inhabited initial-word panels, and inhabited and decorated panels in colours and gold attached to initial words and numerous decorated initial-word panels with gold letters".

The relatively precise dating comes from aspects of the text including the inclusion of Isaac ben Joseph of Corbeil's legal compendium the Sefer Mitzvot Katan, a text known to have been finished in 1277, mentions of Yehiel of Paris, who died in 1286, as still alive, and "a table of moladot (lunation-commencements) for the period 1279/80 - 1295/95 (f. 444)". The style of the miniatures accords with this date range.

== Provenance ==
Inscriptions record various points in the manuscript's history, though many gaps remain. It perhaps left France for Germany in the persecutions of 1306. A loan of the book is noted in 1426, and in 1431 it was sold to an Abraham ben Moses of Coburg. By 1479 it was in Italy at Mestre on the coast opposite Venice, where it went next, followed by Padua in 1480 and Iesi near Ancona in 1481. The 16th century bookbinding has the arms of the Jewish Rovigo family, but in the 17th century the manuscript passed into Christian hands, including the Barberini family. It was examined by the Christian Hebraist Giovanni Bernardo De Rossi and published in his work Variae lectionis veteris testamenti (Parma, 1784). It was bought by a Paris bookseller from a Milan collection for the British Museum in 1839.

== See also ==
- Jews in the French Middle Ages
- Medieval Hebrew literature
