= Jeremy Maule =

British scholar

Jeremy Frank Maule (11 August 1952, Wuppertal, Germany – 25 November 1998, Cambridge) was a British scholar specialising in English literature and the history of the English language. He had an especial interest in seventeenth-century poetry and in manuscripts from this period.

He was educated at St Paul's Cathedral School, where he sang as a chorister at the funeral of Winston Churchill in 1965, and at The King's School, Canterbury. He went from there to read history at Christ Church, Oxford, taking the best First in his year at Finals. (John Milbank was, on his own account, a less successful contemporary.) An account of Maule's time as an undergraduate recalls him as a man,

who, even at 19, had seemed extraordinary, best read of anyone I've ever met, stuffed with obscure nuggets of literary and historical quotations, out of time in 1970s Oxford, in a tweed Norfolk jacket into which his mother had sown a plethora of always full book pockets.... leaning out of a train window after my 21st birthday party calling "don't forget to feed the parrot" (it was some time before I tracked this apparent non-sequitur down to Cold Comfort Farm), impossible to keep up with as he strode across any quad, retracing Stevenson's journey across the Cevennes (though without a donkey), writing a mock epic in rhyming heroic couplets about a holiday I took in Greece with a friend...

Maule went on to work for seven years as a researcher in the House of Lords library (his acquaintance Philip Hensher later held a similar position). But his love of English literature caused Maule to return to academia via a part-time degree in medieval studies at Birkbeck College and an Oxford doctorate that was never completed to temporary teaching posts at Oxford colleges. A protégé of Anne Barton, he was appointed in 1986 to a permanent Fellowship at her college in Cambridge, Trinity, where he taught for the remainder of his life. A don of the old school, he was resident in college and readily embraced the responsibility of teaching by tutorial, being more concerned with inspiring those he taught and supervised than with producing publications of his own. Most of his published scholarship accordingly appeared posthumously, edited by his colleagues and students.

Nonetheless, during his lifetime Maule was the editor, with his colleague Adrian Poole, of the Oxford Book of Classical Verse in Translation (1995). Following his early death a bequest from Maule's will also helped bring to fruition a project he had long cherished: the creation of Renaissance Texts from Manuscript (RTM), a scholarly press for the publication of unprinted sixteenth- and seventeenth-century manuscripts. Four volumes appeared, under the general editorship of Marie Axton, on subjects as diverse as dance, female (auto)biography, and rhetoric, reflecting Maule's own multifarious interests and exacting qualities as an editor.

As this suggests, Maule had a particular interest in manuscript research–latterly he taught post-medieval palaeography to graduate literature students in Cambridge–and himself made a number of significant discoveries. The most important of these was his identification in 1997 of an unknown manuscript treatise by Thomas Traherne entitled 'The Kingdom of God' in Lambeth Palace Library. He also brought to light unknown records bearing upon on the early biography of John Milton, a poem by John Ford, and two manuscripts of Elizabeth Cary's play Edward II. At his death he was engaged in producing editions of the poetry of Mildmay Fane, second earl of Westmorland, and also Andrew Marvell's Mr. Smirke; Or, the Divine in Mode. He became increasingly interested in women's writing of the seventeenth-century and was the co-convenor of the Trinity/Trent Colloquium in the field.

Maule had a huge circle of friends across the world, most of them scholars, offering them hospitality during visits to Cambridge in tacit exchange for scholarly conversation (what he called 'the higher gossip') . He sported a full beard (and, in later life, piercings), which he deployed conversationally. His next-door colleague at St John's College, Cambridge, John Kerrigan, described him as a 'convivial but private, institutionally committed but elusive' man.

Maule succumbed to complications arising from HIV infection. His funeral and memorial service were held in the chapel of Trinity College, Cambridge, with many of those he taught taking part in the ceremonies. Maule is buried in the Parish of the Ascension Burial Ground in Cambridge.

His students included Philip West (Somerville College, Oxford), Heather Wolfe (Folger Shakespeare Library), and Andrew Zurcher (Queens' College, Cambridge).

== Publications ==
- (ed. with Adrian Poole) The Oxford Book of Classical Verse in Translation (Oxford University Press, 1995)
- 'Thomas Carew's Epitaph for Maria Wentworth at Toddington, Bedfordshire', Church Monuments: Journal of the Church Monuments Society, 14 (1999), pp. 74 ff.
- 'To the memory of the late excellent Poet John Fletcher': A New Poem by John Ford', English Manuscript Studies, 1100–1700 (2000), pp. 136 ff.
- 'What did Morley Give when he Gave a “Plutarch” Life?', in Triumphs of English: Henry Parker, Lord Morley, translator to the Tudor court. New essays in interpretation, ed. Marie Axton and James Carley (British Library, 2000), pp. 107–30.
- 'Donne and the Words of the Law', in John Donne's Professional Lives, ed. David Colclough (D. S. Brewer, 2003), pp. 19–36.
