= Podgrađe Podokićko =

- Settlement
- Location within Croatia
- Country: Croatia
- County: Zagreb
- City: Samobor

Area
  - Total: 1.7 km^{2} (0.66 sq mi)

Population (2021)
  - Total: 137
  - Density: 81/km^{2} (210/sq mi)
- Time zone: UTC+1 (CET)
  - Summer (DST): UTC+2 (CEST)

Podgrađe Podokićko is a settlement (naselje) in the Samobor administrative territory of Zagreb County, Croatia. As of 2011 it had a population of 162 people. Its appelative Podokićko comes from its location "below Okić".

== Notable people ==
- Mihalj Šilobod Bolšić - Roman Catholic priest, mathematician, writer, and musical theorist of Šilobod nobility, primarily known for writing the first Croatian arithmetic textbook Arithmatika Horvatzka (published in Zagreb, 1758).
