= Heather Wolfe =

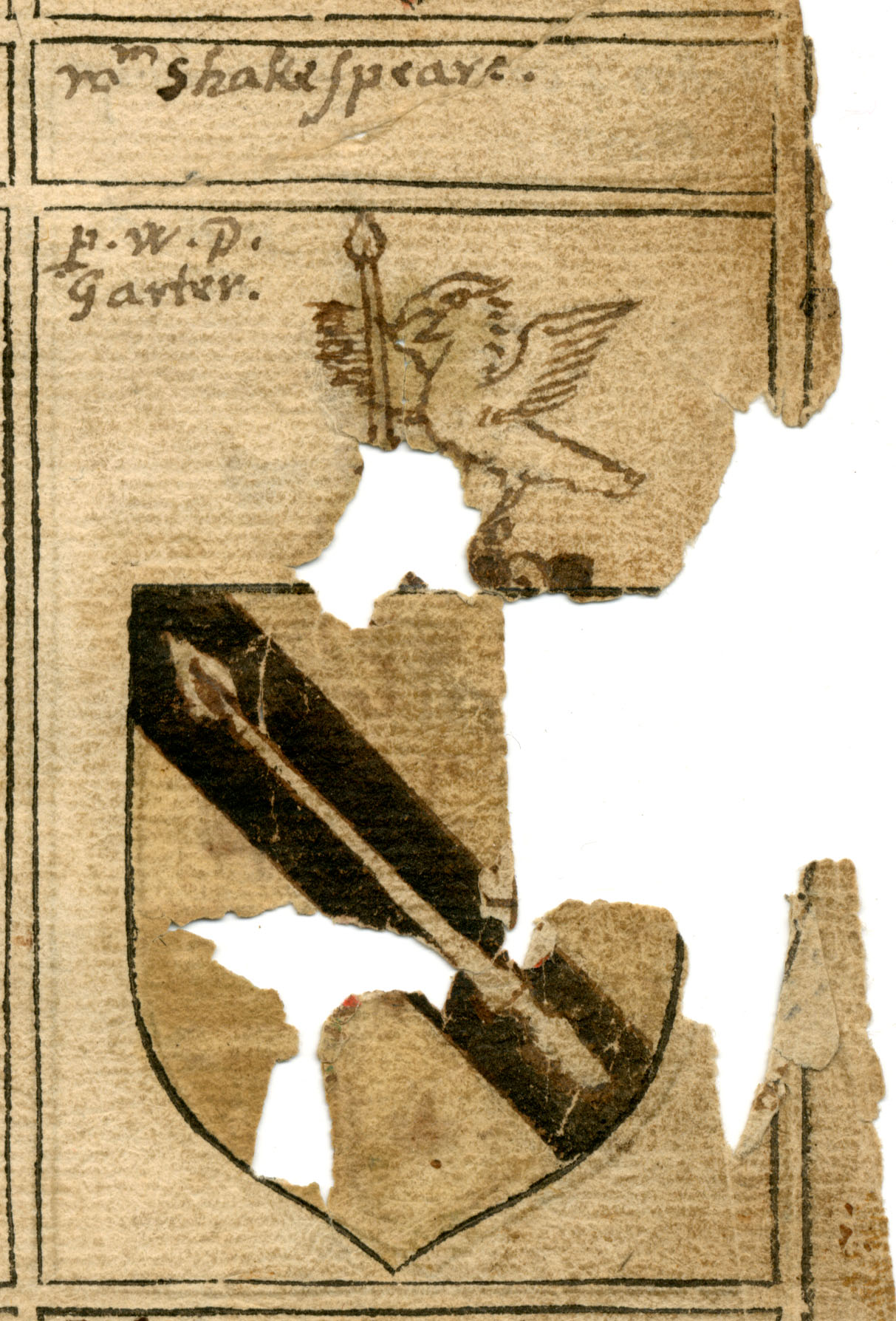
The Shakespeare coat of arms, 1602 version by William Smith, Rouge Dragon

Heather Ruth Wolfe FSA (born 1971) is an American curator of manuscripts and archivist at the Folger Shakespeare Library. A "Shakespeare detective", she has been noted for her research into the history of the Shakespeare coat of arms. She headed "Shakespeare Documented", a project to make contemporary texts involving Shakespeare available online, and is involved in the similar "Early Modern Manuscripts Online" (EMMO) project.

At the Folger, her "Project Dustbunny" has yielded significant results from human cells gathered from 17th-century volumes.

Wolfe was elected as a Fellow of the Society of Antiquaries of London on 16 February 2023.

== Books ==
- Wolfe, Heather; Maule, Jeremy; Axton, Marie (2001). Elizabeth Cary, Lady Falkland : life and letters. Cambridge [England]: RTM Publications. ISBN 978-0866982726.
- Wolfe, Heather; Stewart, Alan (2004). Letterwriting in Renaissance England. Washington, D.C.: Folger Shakespeare Library. ISBN 978-0295985091.
- Wolfe, Heather (2006). The literary career and legacy of Elizabeth Cary, 1613-1680. New York: Palgrave Macmillan. ISBN 978-1403970169.
- Trevilian, Thomas (2007). Wolfe, Heather (ed.). The Trevelyon Miscellany of 1608 : a facsimile of Folger Shakespeare Library MS V.b.232. Washington, D.C.: Folger Shakespeare Library. ISBN 978-0295986593.
