= Cithara octochorda =

18th-century Latin and Croatian hymnal

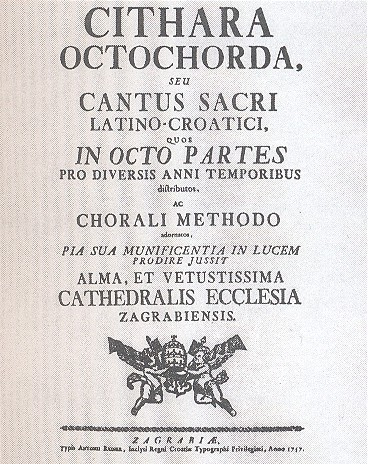
Title page of Cithara Octochorda (1757)

Cithara octochorda (English: Eight-string kithara) is an 18th-century hymnal, containing hymns written in both Latin and Croatian (Kajkavian) language. Its first two editions (1701 and 1723) were published in Vienna, while the third (1757) was published in Zagreb. All three editions contain a total of nearly 500 hymns, of which more than 100 are considered original. The lyrics are accompanied by musical notation and are a mix of older (including medieval or folk) and contemporary (Baroque) compositions and text.

It is assumed that the first two editions were prepared by the Canon of Zagreb, Toma Kovačević, while the third is attributed to Mihalj Šilobod Bolšić. It is the best known and most extensive older Croatian printed anthology of church songs, performed and sung in the Zagreb choral tradition to this day. Many new hymns were added by the third edition from various anonymous composers, suggesting a tradition of composing tunes and lyrics among the Zagreb clergy. The hymnal served as an inspiration to a number of modern Croatian composers and writers such as Franjo Dugan and Vjenceslav Novak.

== Hymns ==
Number	Title	Author	Note
1	U to vrijeme godišta	unknown	first recorded in 15th-century
