= Sveti Martin pod Okićem =

Coordinates: 45°45′N 15°45′E

- Settlement
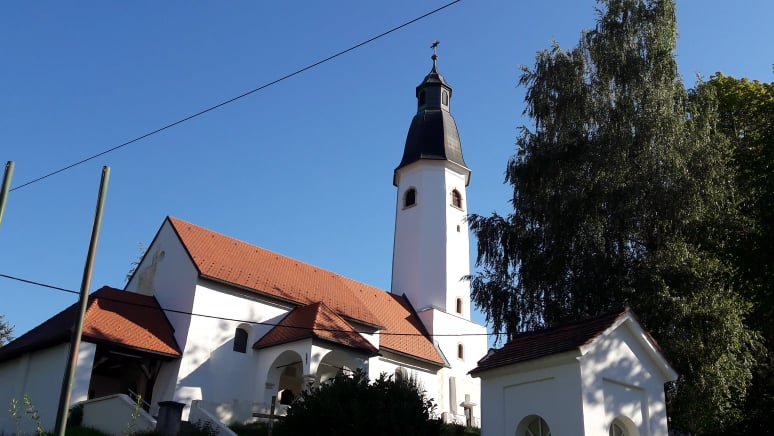
- Church of Sv. Martin in Sveti Martin pod Okićem

- Location within Croatia
- Country: Croatia
- County: Zagreb
- City: Samobor

Area
  - Total: 1.3 km^{2} (0.50 sq mi)

Population (2021)
  - Total: 253
  - Density: 190/km^{2} (500/sq mi)
- Time zone: UTC+1 (CET)
  - Summer (DST): UTC+2 (CEST)

Sveti Martin pod Okićem is a settlement (naselje) in the Samobor administrative territory of Zagreb County, Croatia. As of 2011 it had a population of 258 people. Its appelative pod Okićem comes from its location "below Okić".

== Notable people ==
- Mihalj Šilobod Bolšić - Roman Catholic priest, mathematician, writer, and musical theorist of Šilobod nobility, primarily known for writing the first Croatian arithmetic textbook Arithmatika Horvatzka (published in Zagreb, 1758).

== Bibliography ==
- Pilar, Martin (1911). Crkva u Sv. Martinu pod Okićem (in Serbo-Croatian). Signature HR-ZaNSK GZAH 3626 pil 42.
