= Šilobod =

Croatian noble family

Šilobod Family Crest, awarded to Andrija and Ivan (Johan) Šilobod by Queen Maria Theresa of Austria in 1758.

The House of Šilobod (Alternatively: Sillobod, Silobad, Shilobod, Šilobad, Šilobodec, Šilobadovic, Shelobod, Šilubod; Cyrillic: Шилобод) are a noble family from Podgrađe Podokićko in the Kingdom of Croatia (Habsburg).

== Etymology ==
Šilo is a Serbo-Croatian word meaning awl and Bȏd refers to stitching or sewing.

The name likely refers to a stitching awl or craft profession which worked with leather, such as a shoe or saddle maker, though its origins are unknown.

== History ==
The history of the Croatian people and their many migrations provides context for the genealogy of the Šilobod family. In particular, it is generally accepted that the Croats as a people had their roots in the region of unbaptized Croatia, located in northeastern Europe along the Baltic Sea coast and included parts of modern-day eastern Poland, Latvia, and Lithuania.

It is assumed that the Šilobod family is related to the Šilubod family, which dominates as an autochthonous surname in the province of Šilutė, located along the coast of Lithuania. This is because both families share a common etymological origin in the region, which suggests that they both originated in the same family that migrated southward towards the Balkans in the sixth century. Croatians probably only stayed in what is now northern Europe for two centuries, at most, given that their ancestors emigrated to the peninsula in the third and fourth century. There is evidence of periodic attacks by Tatars and Slavs from the Transcarpathian region, and by the third century, it is probable that all Slavic tribes, including the Croats, were residing in the region north of the Black Sea, behind the Carpathian Mountains. Since the origins of the Croatian name may be traced back to regions in modern-day Iran, it's probable that the initial stages of this migration occurred in Iran long before the birth of Christ.

The definitive Balkan base of the Šilobod family is now Croatian, thanks to the South Slavs' military formations' entrance in the region. In mediaeval times, the town of Podgrađe Podokićko (about 20 kilometres from modern-day Zagreb) was known as Podgradje na Jezeri. There, members of the Šiloboda clan banded together to create two co-ops that serve as autonomous social and economic units. Some members of these groups moved to the Military Border system, with headquarters in Karlovac and Slunj, while others emigrated to the area that is now Slavonia and farther afield to the United States, Australia, and New Zealand in the nineteenth and twentieth centuries, respectively. Eastern Slavonia, Belgrade with Slavic ancestry, Montenegro, and southern Dalmatia are all current locations for variants of the surname Šilobod (Sillobod, Silobad, Shilobod, Šilobad, Šilobodec). The neighbourhoods of Podoki (Podgrađe Podokićko and Sveti Martin pod Okićem), Samobor, Zagreb, and the vicinity of Sisak contain the greatest concentrations of Šiloboda families in the Zagreb area. The United States (specifically Pennsylvania) and Germany, which for economic reasons (fishing) were the most desirable as the end destinations of economic migration in the previous two centuries, have the highest concentrations of Šilobod descendants outside of Croatia. Smaller populations also currently reside in the Russian Federation and Belarus.

== Nobility ==
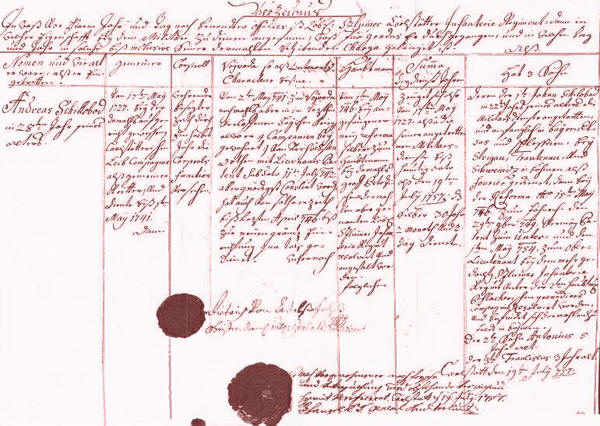
A copy of the original work order on awarding the "von" predicate to Andrija Šilobod

Queen Maria Theresa of Austria awarded nobility to Andrija and Ivan (Johan) Šilobod in 1758 for their military services in the Croatian Military Frontier during 1741. Andrija Šilobod was then a prominent senior member of the Karlovac Military Generalate of the Slunj regiment. He is the father of Mihalj Šilobod Bolšić, a Croatian Roman Catholic priest, mathematician, writer, and musical theorist primarily known for writing the first Croatian arithmetics textbook Arithmetika Horvatzka. From 1735 to 1739, Andrija participated in military operations against the Turks, as was required by the Habsburg Kingdom of Croatia.

== Notable descendants ==
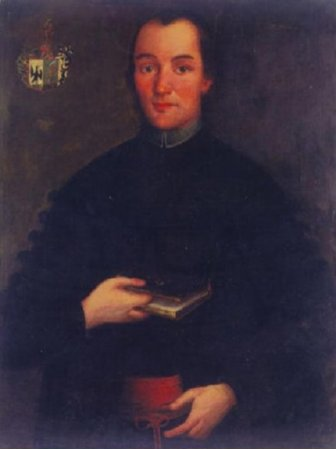
Mihalj Šilobod Bolšić – 18th C. Croatian Mathematician and writer of the Kajkavian language

- Pavao Šilobadović (17th century) – Croatian Franciscan chronicler, pastor, and teacher in the Makarska Littoral. Author of the Chronicle in the Littoral (1662–1686), documenting local struggles against the Ottoman Empire
- Mihalj Šilobod Bolšić (1724–1787) – Roman Catholic priest, mathematician, writer, and music theorist primarily known for writing the first Croatian arithmetic textbook Arithmatika Horvatzka (published in Zagreb, 1758)
- Mikhail Isidorovich Shilobod (Russian Cyrillic: Михаил Исидорович Шилобод; 1931–?) – Russian former Senior Lecturer, Associate Professor, Dean of the Faculty of History, Head of the Department of History of the CPSU at Orlov State Pedagogical Institute
- Vincent Shilobod (1950-2025) – Carnegie Medal recipient
- Mlađan Šilobad (1971–current) – (Serbian Cyrillic: Млађан Шилобад) Serbian basketball executive and former player. He is currently serving as the general manager of the KK Partizan NIS

== See also ==
- Croatian Military Frontier
- Croatian nobility
- History of Croatia
- Kingdom of Croatia (Habsburg)
- List of noble families of Croatia
- Timeline of Croatian history
