= List of Croatian-language poets =

Below is a list of poets who wrote or write much of their poetry in Croatian.

== A ==
- Borislav Arapović (born 1935)

== B ==
- Lidija Bajuk (born 1965)
- Juraj Baraković (1548–1628)
- Milan Begović (1876–1948)
- Ivan Belostenec (1593/1594–1675)
- Mirko Bogović (1816–1893)
- Tituš Brezovački (1757–1805)
- Ivana Brlić-Mažuranić (1874–1938)
- Ivan Bunić Vučić (1591/1592–1658)

== C ==
- Dobriša Cesarić (1902–1980)
- Ilija Crijević (1463–1520)

== D ==
- Arsen Dedić (1938–2015)
- Mak Dizdar (1917–1971)
- Dragutin Domjanić (1875–1933)
- Džore Držić (1461–1501)
- Marin Držić (1508–1567)

== G ==
- Drago Gervais (1904–1957)
- Stanka Gjurić (Born 1956)
- Vladimir Gotovac (1930–2000)
- Ivan Gundulić (1589–1638)

== H ==
- August Harambašić (1861–1911)
- Petar Hektorović (1487–1572)

== J ==
- Dragojla Jarnević (1812–1875)
- Ivan Franjo Jukić (1818–1857)

== K ==
- Petar Kanavelić (1637–1719)
- Brne Karnarutić (1515–1573)
- Jure Kaštelan (1919–1990)
- Jerolim Kavanjin (1641–1714)
- Ivan Goran Kovačić (1913–1943)
- Ivo Kozarčanin (1911–1941)
- Miroslav Krleža (1893–1981)
- Rajmund Kupareo (1914–1996)

== M ==
- Marko Marulić (1450–1524)
- Antun Gustav Matoš (1873–1914)
- Šiško Menčetić (1457–1527)
- Andrija Kačić Miošić (1704–1760)

== N ==
- Vladimir Nazor (1876–1949)
- Vjenceslav Novak (1859–1905)

== O ==
- Ilija Okrugić (1827–1897)

== P ==
- Vesna Parun (1922–2010)

== S ==
- Sonja Smolec (born 1953)
- Đuro Sudeta (1903–1927)

== Š ==
- Mihalj Šilobod Bolšić (1724–1787)
- Antun Branko Šimić (1898–1925)
- Antun Šoljan (1932–1993)
- Dragutin Tadijanović (1905–2007)

== U ==
- Tin Ujević (1891–1955)

== V ==
- Viktor Vida (1913–1960)
- Vladimir Vidrić (1875–1909)

== W ==
- Ljubo Wiesner (1885–1951)
