= Mihalj Šilobod Bolšić =

Croatian mathematician

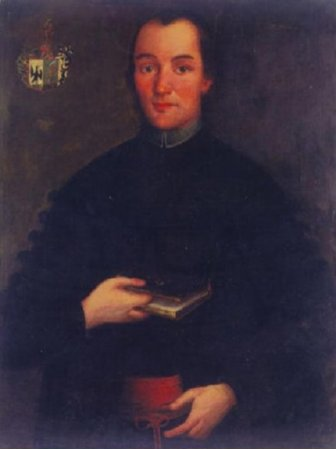
- Portrait
- Born: 1 November 1724; Podgrađe Podokićko, Kingdom of Croatia (Habsburg)
- Died: 4 April 1787 (aged 62); Sveta Nedelja, Kingdom of Croatia (Habsburg)
- Education: University of Vienna; University of Bologna
- Known for: Arithmetika Horvatzka
- Scientific career
- Fields: Mathematics, musicology, and Catholicism

Mihalj Šilobod Bolšić (1 November 1724 – 4 April 1787) was a Croatian Roman Catholic priest, mathematician, writer, and musical theorist primarily known for writing the first Croatian arithmetics textbook Arithmetika Horvatzka (published in Zagreb, 1758).

== Biography ==
Mihalj was born in Podgrađe Podokićko on 1 November 1724 as the son of Andrija Šilobod and Margareta Gunarić (Guunarich). He was baptised one day later at the local church as evidenced by an extract from the register of baptisms for Mihalj Šilobod, located at the parish in Podgrađe Podokićko.

Andrija Šilobod was then a prominent senior member of the Karlovac Military Generalate of the Slunj regiment. From 1735 to 1739, Andrija participated in military operations against the Turks, as was required by the Habsburg Kingdom of Croatia. Mihalj's brother, Ivan (Johan) Šilobod, was also a soldier in the Slunj infantry. Andrija and Ivan were awarded nobility by Queen Maria Theresa of Austria in 1758 for their military services in the Croatian Military Frontier in 1741.

Šilobod Family Crest, awarded to Mihalj's father and brother by Queen Maria Theresa of Austria in 1758.

Mihalj was initially schooled at the Jesuit school in Samobor, Zagreb. Later, he studied philosophy at the University of Vienna and continued further education in theology at the University of Bologna. Once he finished university in 1747, he went to work as a chaplain in the towns of Tuhlje and Ivanec, in what is now Hrvatsko Zagorje. He pioneered literacy efforts for the low-income Croatian community in a number of parishes, making him a standout even in that very deprived region.

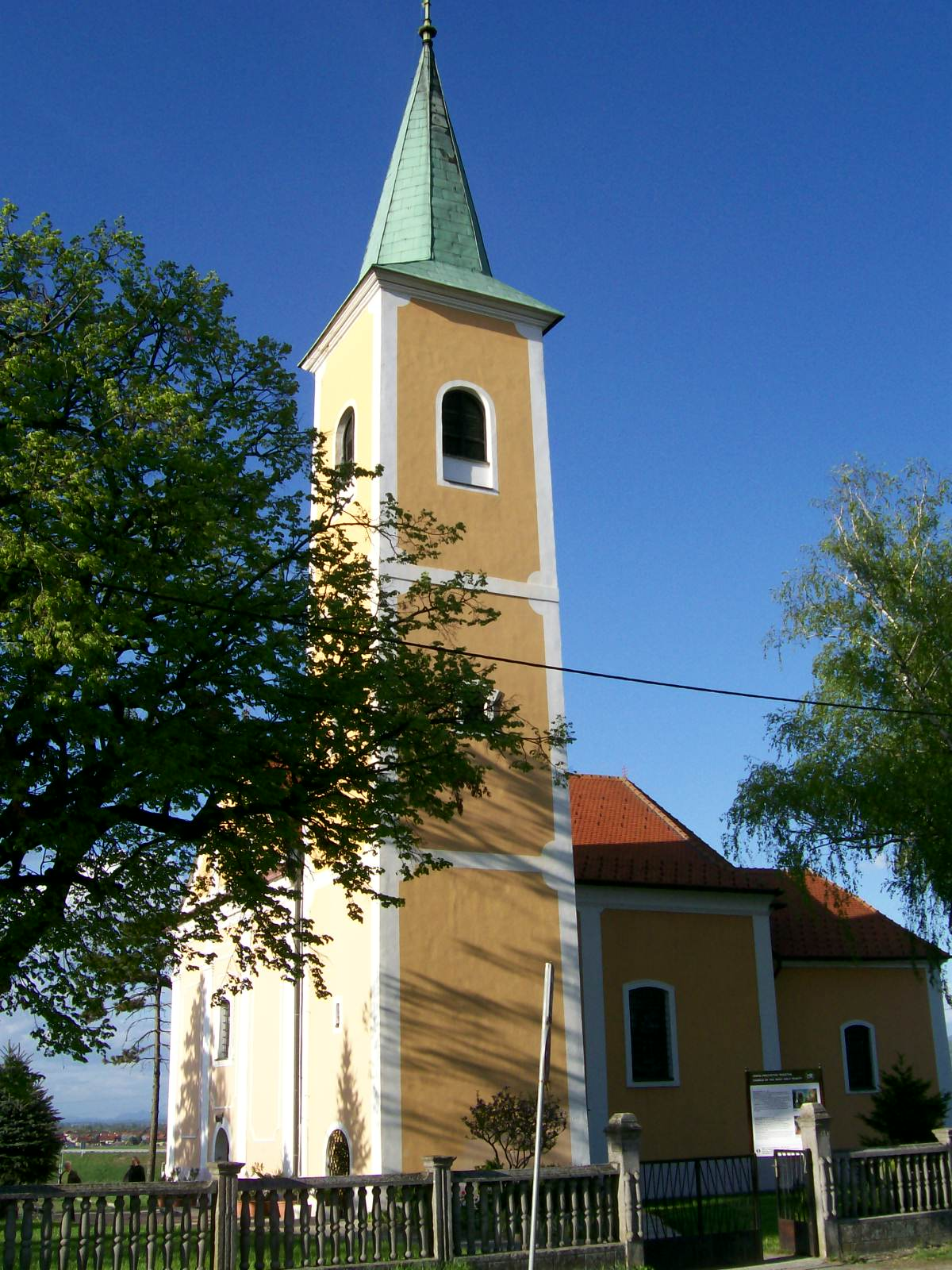
Church of the Holy Trinity in Sveta Nedelja

In 1751, Šilobod was appointed pastor in Martinska Ves near Sisak. In 1783, he renovated the dilapidated local parish church at Sv. Nedelja, which was formerly in the care of the Erdödy family. These works included raising the walls, naves and sanctuaries, adding a new sacristy, painting the main altar painted, and arranging a tomb for the pastors in which he is also buried. The big clock on the church tower (horologium) drew special attention and praise from the monarchy, which he created and placed himself. Additionally, he commissioned the construction of the Sveti Rok brick choir, which is still in use today.

In the same period, while he served in Sv. Nedjelja, he particularly advocated for the construction of the first public school in Sveti Martin pod Okićem in 1761, the neighboring parish of where he was born. Mihalj's father Andreas bought from the land for this school from the Catholic Church and, with the assistance of the Zrinski family, transferred the ownership to his son Mihalj. Mihalj drew out the plans for the school and raised enough money to pay for the building's stone foundations and half of the bottom story during his lifetime; however, after his passing, his successors were unable to gather enough money to continue building. Had Mihael lived long enough to see the project through, the school would have been the first post-war public institution of learning in rural Croatia. Nevertheless, the uncompleted structure did not go to waste and in January 1867, it housed its first class of pupils. The elementary school (OŠ Mihaela Šiloboda) still retains Mihalj's namesake to this day.

He died in Sveta Nedelja on 4 April 1787 and was buried in one of the tombs in Sv. Nedjelja. In his life, Mihalj was pious and never used the acquired nobility in his title or professional career. In fact, his father Andrija claimed that the priest signed all of his documents with the simple name "M. Šilobod" out of a desire for humility and to avoid the privileges and trappings of nobility. In Arithmetika Horvatzka, he uses both his birth and baptismal surname, Šilobod, and his second ("different") last name, Bolšić, to honour the feminine lineage of his family tree, which originated with his grandmother and had a profound impact on his life's social orientation. Many people from Hrvatsko Zagorje and Sisak Posavina, as well as Catholic Church leaders and a high-ranking military delegation from the Slunj Regiment, were documented as having travelled to Sv. Nedelja for the burial.

== Major works ==
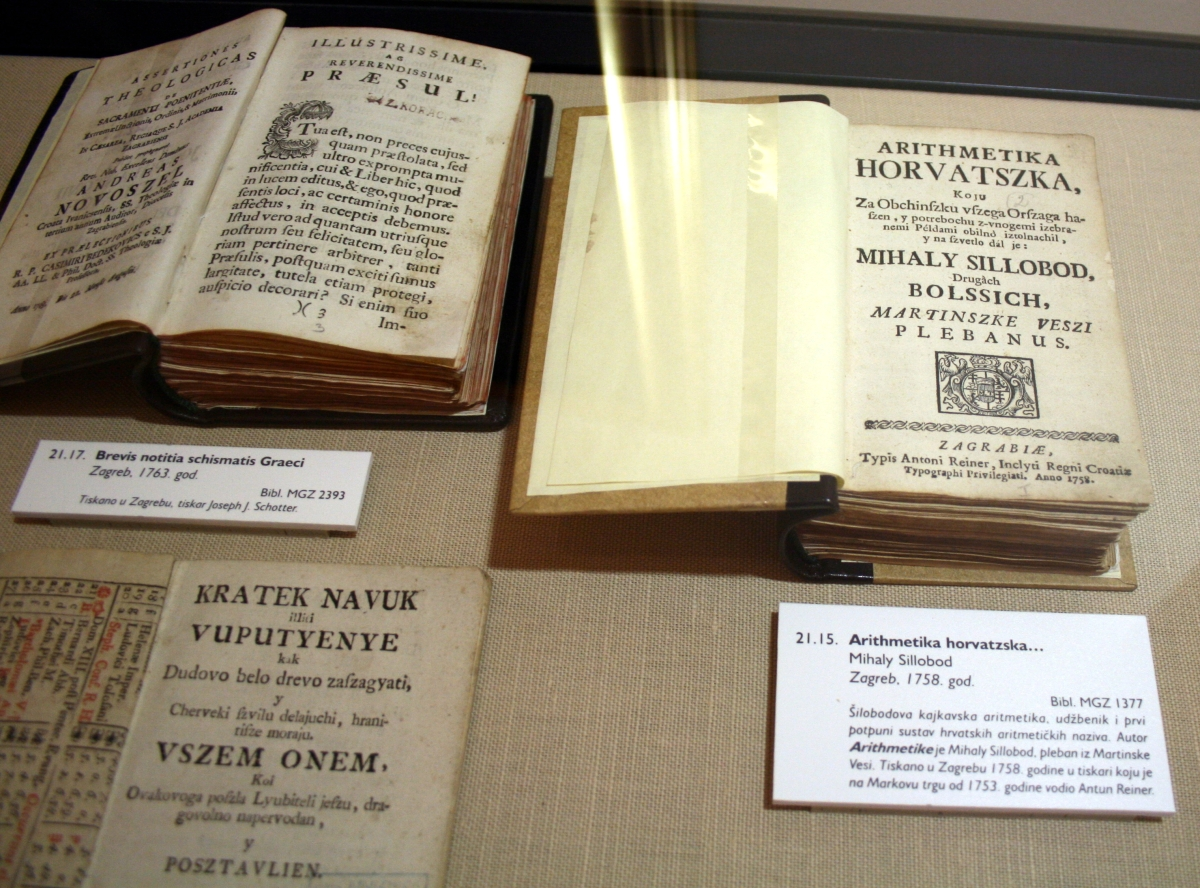
Arithmetika Horvatzka, Zagreb (1758)

Šilobod wrote mainly in Latin and Croatian. In addition to his main works, he also wrote various poems and songs, primary in Latin. His major publications include:

- Zbirka crkvenih pjesama ("Collection of Church Songs"; 1757) – An anthology of traditional songs and hymns from rural Croatia.
- Arithmetika Horvatszka koju na obchinszku vszega országos haszen, y, z-potrebochu vnogemi izebranemi Példami obilnò iztolnachil, y na szvetlo dal. (1758.)
- Fundamentum cantus Gregoriani seu chroralis pro Captu Tyronis discipuli, ex probatis authoribus collectum, et brevi, ac facili dialogica methodo in lucem expositum opera, ac studio. ("The basis of the singing of Gregorian melodies, or the chroralis definite for the disciples saw it, from the classical authors, and deposited in a short time, exposed to the light of the work of the Method in the rich and of easy dialogica, and a studio."). (1760.)
- Cabala de lesu Lotto. ("Cabala about the game of lotto and various fortunes") (1768.)
- Cabala, to je na vszakoiachka pitanya kratki ter vendar prikladni odgovori vu horvaczkom jeziku. (Unknown Year) – A small practical lexicon or a short answer to all students' questions, especially concerning questions about Croatian language, and some church works.

=== Cithara Octochord Collection (1751) ===
Šilobod was the editor of the third edition of the Cithara Octochord Collection (1751), according to musicological study. This edition represents a form of restoration intervention in the Zagreb church's liturgical-musical programme. CO's greatest creative worth and innovation are hymnic forms with innovative text and music content, in which Šilobod undoubtedly played an active role as a poet, musician, and composer.

=== Zbirka crkvenih pjesama (1757) ===
After moving into the rural countryside and immersing himself in the local culture he began compiling traditional songs and hymns that had been passed down orally until then. He gathered a treasury of songs, and published them in Zagreb under Zbirka Crkvenih Pjesama ("Collection of Church Songs;" 1757), a book with almost 300 pages of unlicensed sheet music.

=== Arithmetika Horvatzka (1758) ===
His best known work, Arithmetika Horvatzka (1758), written in the vernacular Kajkavian dialect of Croatian language, established a complete system of arithmetic terminology in Croatian, and vividly used examples from everyday life in Croatia to present mathematical operations. Šilobod drew inspiration for his arithmetic handbook from a variety of sources, including the classic arithmetic handbook by Italian author Giuseppe Maria Figatelli. It was published 1758 in Zagreb, divided in four parts and signed as Mihalj Šilobod-Bolšić, as appropriate to the Kajkavian dialect.

Public education in the Habsburg Monarchy was not institutionalised until the middle of the 18th century. The teaching service was sometimes done by municipally assigned teachers, and sometimes by parish priests. Students were taught to read and write, but it wasn't until the middle of the 18th century that they were also taught to count. Calculus textbooks were only available in foreign languages at the time, and the subject had to be taught in Croatian. The textbook's creation was prompted by a desire to uplift the material conditions of the local people through education. Mihalj identified that there was a severe lack of accounting skills in local organisers who struggled to handle even the most basic financial and business calculations. As the contemporary Croatian mathematician Mate Zoricic describes: "This is the main evil and the cause of poverty and misery in the people, and while foreigners, knowing the calculation, come to Dalmatia and get rich in a short time, sometimes it is not enough for our people even to nutrition." Thus, the book was written for a wide range of people who were literate but could not read Latin, such as business people, hosts, and anyone else who might need an account. Because of this, it is full of examples from real-world situations. In addition, it consistently demonstrates how one currency may be exchanged for another by pointing out the conversion of currencies and assigning activities in which Groschen and Kreuzer occur together.

The general structure of Arithmetika Horvatzka adapted the structure and presentation style of similarly utilitarian books from the same time period: The first section of Šilobod's manual covers the four basic arithmetic operations (addition, subtraction, multiplication, and division), the second section covers all operations with fractions, the third section covers the simple and complex rule of three, and the fourth section covers real-world business applications (such as accounts, debts, profits and losses, and mix calculus). This fourth section also includes some additional in-depth explanations, puzzles and riddles, presumably aimed at students who have previously demonstrated an adequate grasp of the material presented in sections one through three. One of the puzzles, for example, states: Two fathers and two sons once hunted three rabbits, and each of them liked one rabbit. How can that be? Explanation: He had to be father, son and son's son, i.e. grandson. So two fathers and two sons each have a rabbit."Silobod hoped that including riddles in his book would make the material more engaging and readable for the general public." Tables of various uses are presented on the final 36 pages of the book that are not numbered. Knowledge of fundamental accounting and all accounts that emerge in real life, especially in commerce, were regarded as essential learning. The book's content, explanations and exercises serve their intended function by including the computation of mixes and other calculations that are part of everyday economic mathematics.

Since the guidebook was the first to be written in Croatian language, this is the first appearance of any Croatian mathematical terms. Although it was clear that Šilobod had made use of words that were in dictionaries, this was clearly insufficient for his purposes. On the other hand, dictionaries lacked entries for the more advanced mathematical terminology since they were not commonly used. Because of this, Šilobod realised he was up against an enormous challenge: his handbook would be the first documented record of the preexisting mathematical language in the Kaikavian region. For this reason, he would have had to modify existing dictionary terms, especially that found in J. Belloszténcz's lexicon. Later, he would have had to create the terminology he need, drawing on the origins of existing words with overlapping meanings from the Kaikavian dialect of Croatian. Evidently, he had made up some names by adapting Latin terminology to Kaikavian use.

=== Fundamentum cantus Gregoriani seu chroralis (1760) ===
Fundamentum cantus Gregoriani seu chroralis is considered to be his second most famous publication. It delves into musical-Gregorian melodic principles. It is divided into six dialogues in which they discuss: the birth of music or singing (dialogue one); drawing, notes, and clefs (dialogue two); solmization (dialogue three); intervals (dialogue four); genuine and plagal tones (dialogue five); and intonation (dialogue six). For over a century, this handbook was used as a liber textus in the Zagreb seminary. As of today, this work is still studied in the Accademia Nazionale di Santa Cecilia in Rome and is considered a great theoretical guide to choral singing even after a century has passed.

== Legacy ==
Because it was the first appearance of the systematically used Croatian mathematical vocabulary, Šilobod's Arithmatika Horvatzka has had enormous cultural value in Croatia. In addition, the manual played a crucial part in the education in Croatian people at a time when there was a pressing need to increase students' understanding of accounting's function in business and economics.

Even a century after his death, the famous phrase that Arithmetika printed at the time had a huge resonance among the people "Ak ne buš učil matematiku išel buš k Šilobodu da te poduči!" ("If you didn't teach mathematics, you went to Šilobod to teach you!") – is still prevalent. His name has entered several other idioms, especially among Kajkavians. For example, it has long been customary to encourage anybody who calculates incorrectly to pray to Šilobod, and when someone wishes to brag about successfully counting or multiplying, they may playfully add, "It would be the same with Šilobod."

Hrvatska pošta issued a commemorative stamp in 2008, celebrating 250 years since the publishing of Arithmatika Horvatzka. Irena Mišurac Zorica concluded in her analysis of the work that Mihalj Šilobod Bolšić demonstrated a very high pedagogical and methodical maturity, creating a standard for further development of mathematics curriculum and education.

In addition to the stamp, a scientific symposium was organised in Sveta Nedjelja to honour Mihalj Šilobod Bolšić. It was the first scientific conference honouring the priest and teacher who is revered in Kajkavian culture. The Samobor Museum produced a book in 2009 that included the writings of the seven people who had taken part in the scientific meeting: Ph.D. Stjepan Razum, prof. Domagoj Sremi, prof. PhD Alojz Jembriha, MSc sc. Irena Mišurac Zorica, PhD Zvonimir Jakobovi, MSc sc. Marijane Bori, and PhD Katarina Koprek. These writings help provide light on the life and accomplishments of Mihalj, an important figure in the spread of mathematics education in the 18th century. To celebrate the event, the Museum issued a reproduction of the entire Arithmatika Horvatzka in separate volumes, and the collection includes a transcription of Šilobod's prologue to the work in its appendix.

== Gallery ==
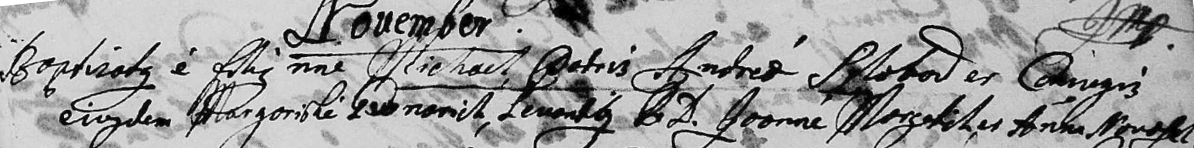
An excerpt of the baptismal record of Mihalj Šilobod Bolšić from the register of baptisms of the parish of Sveti Martin pod Okićem. 1724.

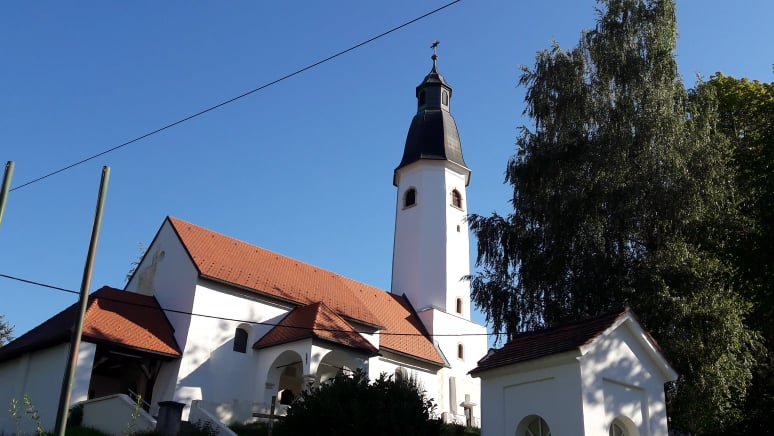
Church of Sv. Martin in Sveti Martin pod Okićem, where Mihlj was baptised.

== See also ==
- Šilobod
- Sveta Nedelja, Zagreb County
- Samobor
- Croatian literature
- Catholic Church in Croatia
- Timeline of Croatian history
- List of Catholic clergy scientists
- List of Catholic authors
- List of Catholic priests
- List of people from Croatia
- List of Croatian-language poets
- List of noble families of Croatia
- List of important publications in mathematics
