= Okić Castle =

Okić
- Podgrađe Podokićko, Samobor, Zagreb County; Croatia
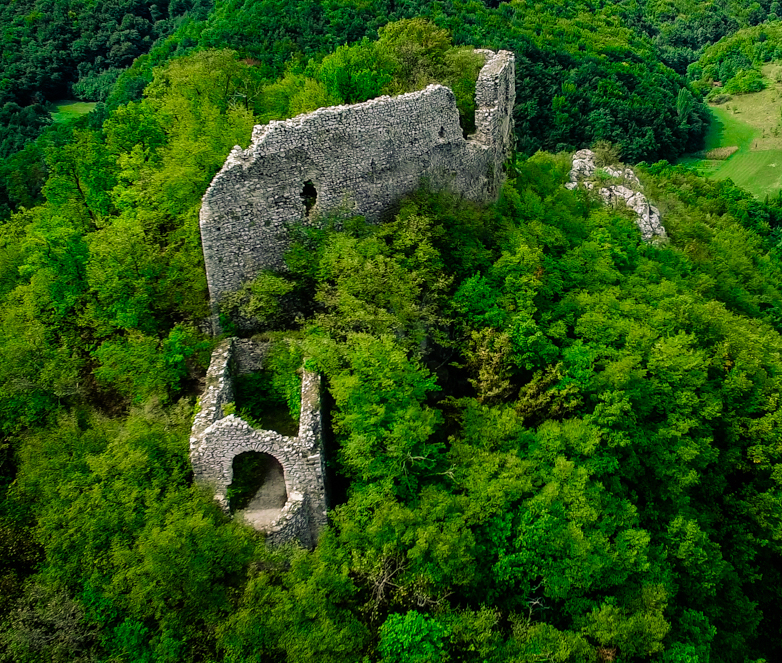
- Aerial view of Okić

Site information
- Type: Castle
- Controlled by: Okićki, then Hungarian royal, then Benvenuto Ostrožinski, Frankopan, then Horvat then Erdődy families
- Open to the public: yes
- Condition: ruins

Location
- Location within Croatia
- Coordinates: 45.7486°N 15.7064°E
- Height: 498

Site history
- Materials: Limestone

Okić Castle is a castle in Samobor, Zagreb County. The names of many surrounding villages include it as an appellative, including Dolec Podokićki, Drežnik Podokićki, Novo Selo Okićko, Orešje Okićko, Podgrađe Podokićko, Poljanica Okićka and Sveti Martin pod Okićem.

== History ==
For the fortification of Ivanić in 1598, Okić had to supply 4 carts and 10 labourers.

In the 19th century, Ferdo Livadić composed a song about the castle titled Okić grad.

== Gallery ==
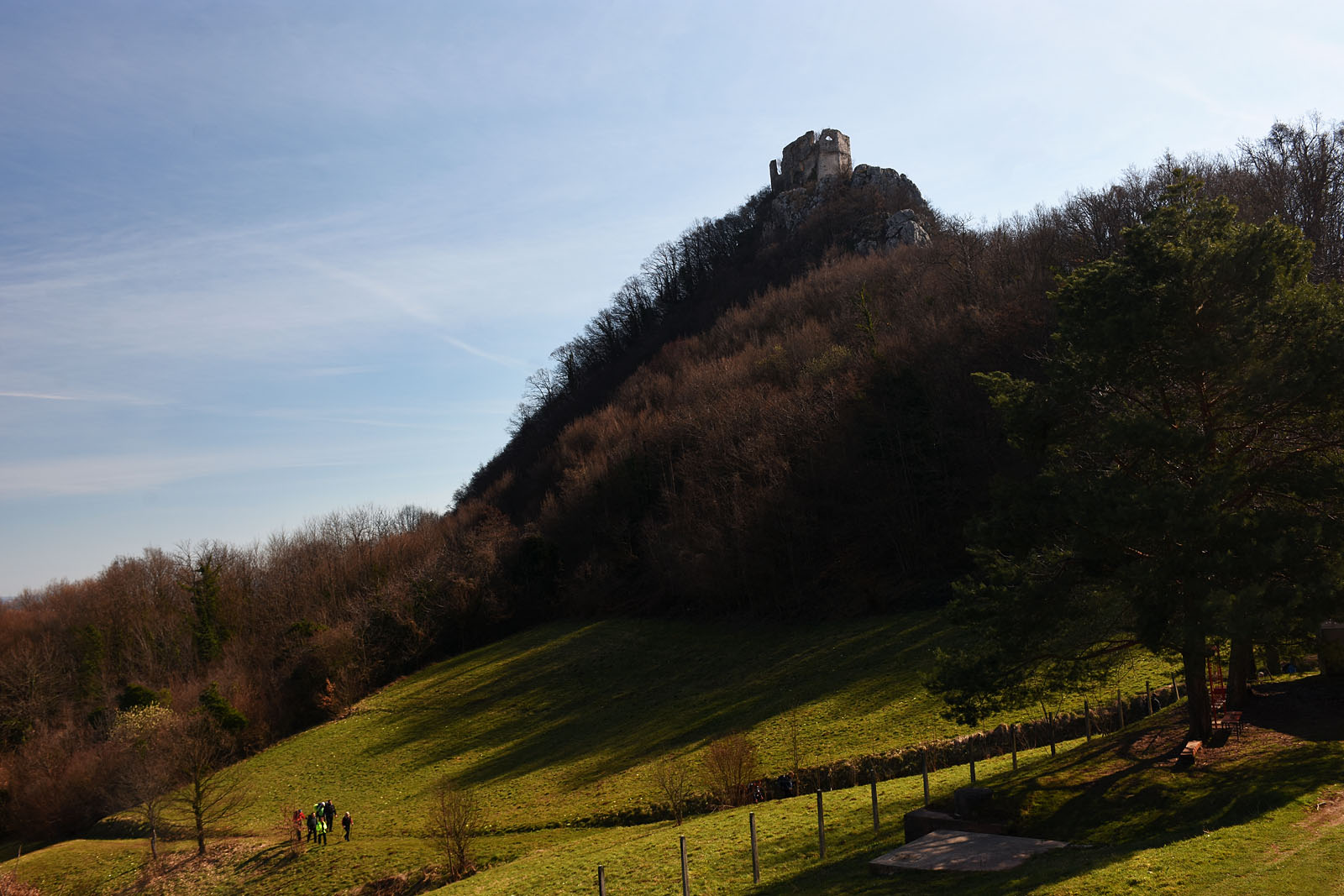
Skyline

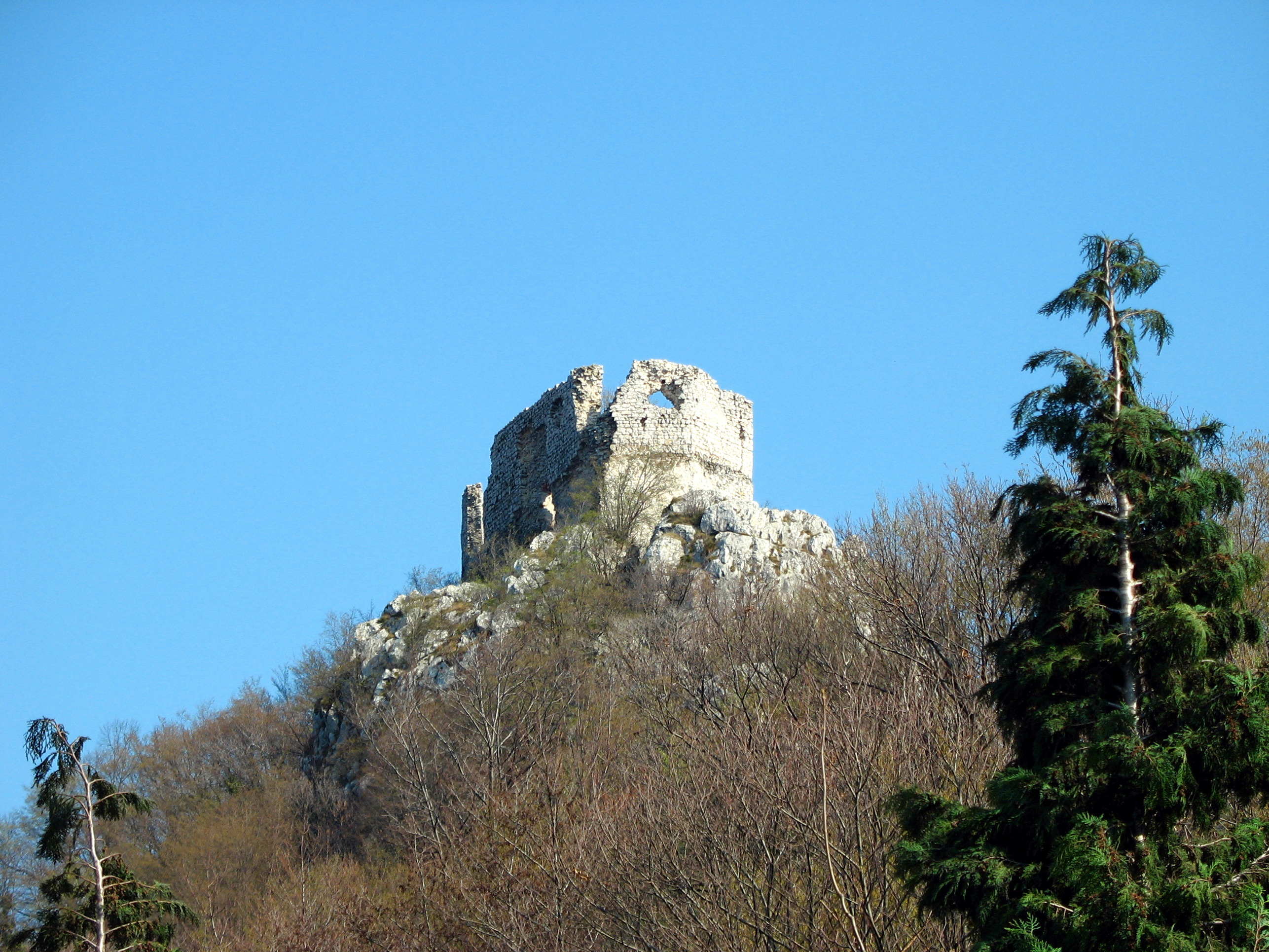
View from below

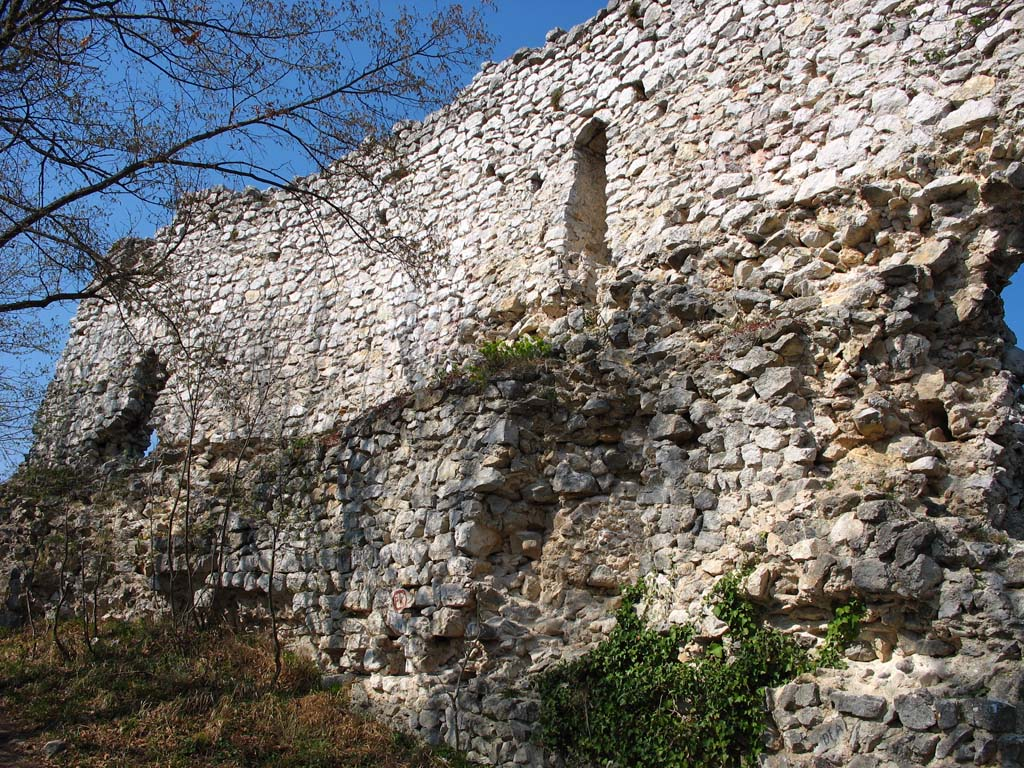
Standing wall

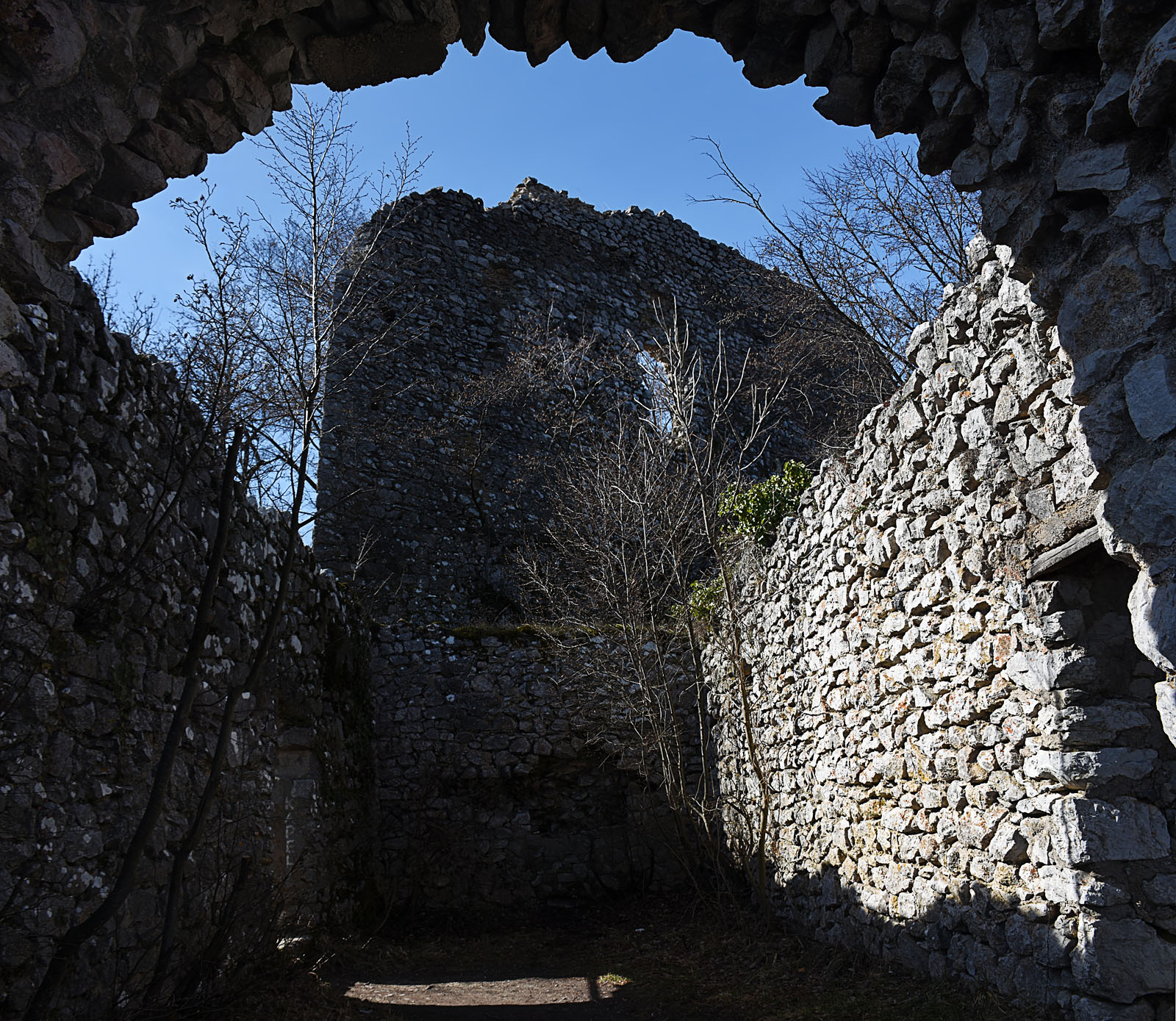
Innterior

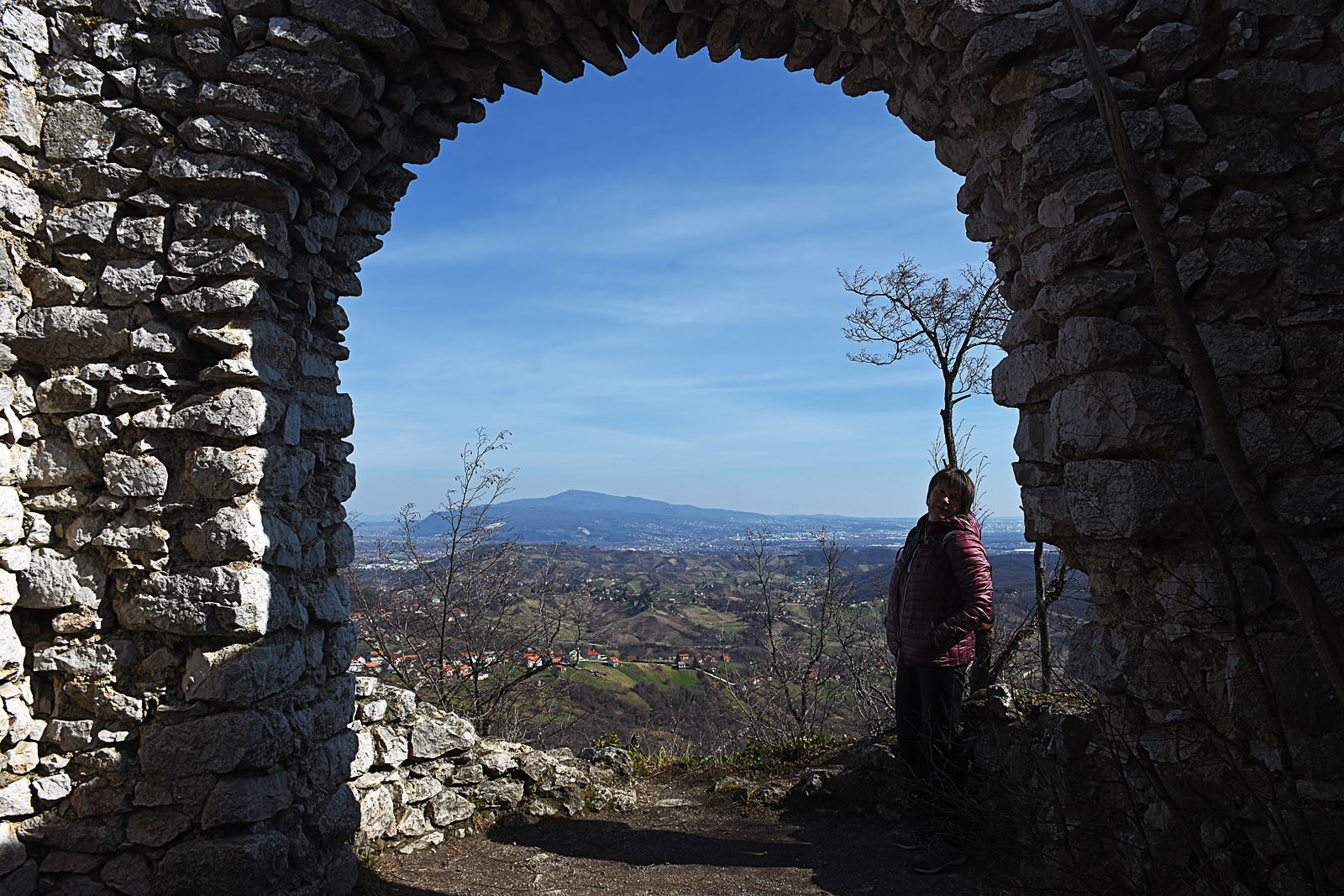
Window view

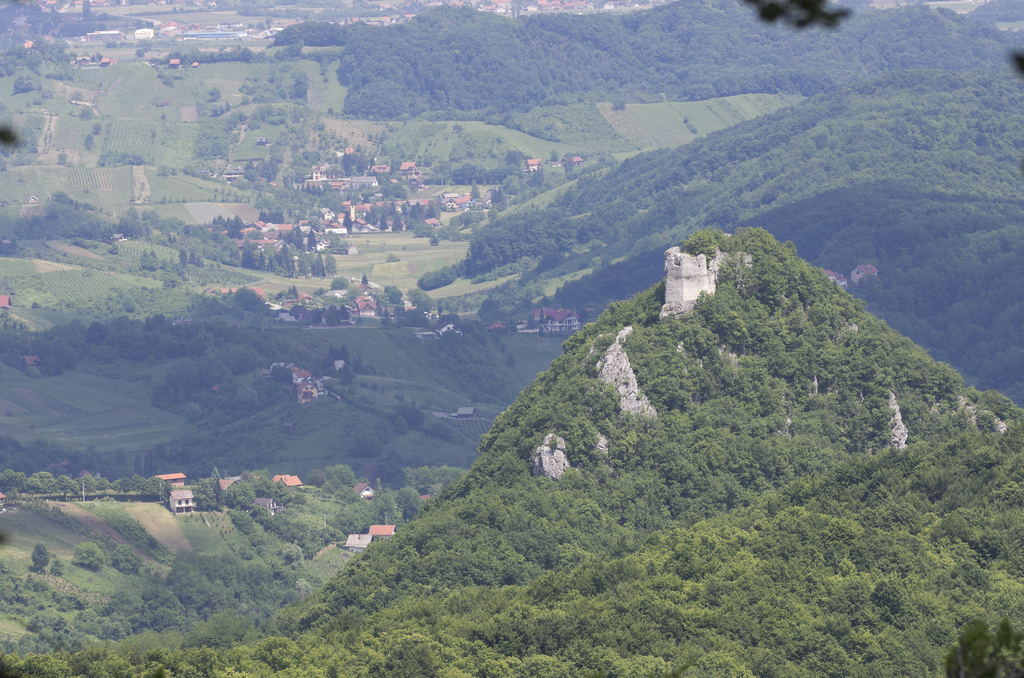
View from above

== Bibliography ==
- Oštrić, Vlatko (2003-12-15). "Okić u hrvatskom planinarstvu: uspon Dragojle Jarnević prije 160 godina" (PDF). Hrvatski planinar (in Serbo-Croatian). No. 12. pp. 372–376. ISSN 1330-2159.
- Šišić, Ferdo, ed. (1917-07-13) [written 1598-04-14]. "Zaključci hrvatsko-slavonskoga sabora sazvana u Zagrebu za 14. aprila". Hrvatski saborski spisi. Monumenta spectantia historiam Slavorum meridionalium (in Latin). Vol. XLI, IV. Zagreb. pp. 375–379.
- Livadić, Ferdo (n.d.), Okić grad Signature HR-ZaNSK Livadić 54.
