= Thomas Trevelyon =

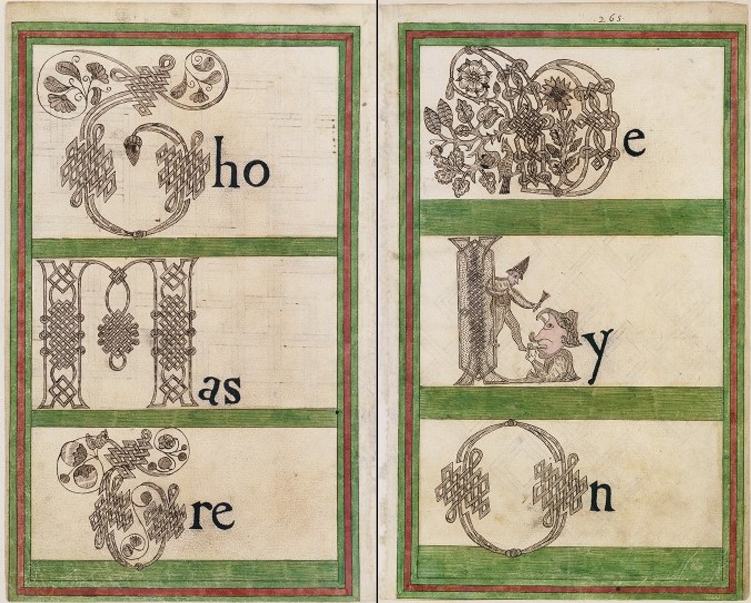
- Born: circa 1548
- Other names: Thomas Trevilian
- Occupations: Embroidery pattern drawer, calligrapher
- Years active: 1603-1616
- Known for: The Trevelyon Miscellany of 1608; The Great Book of Thomas Trevilian

Thomas Trevelyon (born circa 1548) lived in England (probably London) and is believed to have been an embroidery pattern drawer. He is long known for having compiled two large manuscript miscellanies, the Miscellany of 1608 now in the collection of the Folger Shakespeare Library, and the Great Book of 1616 now in the library at Wormsley Park. A third miscellany, in the collection of University College London was identified as being in his hand in 2012, and dates to circa 1603.

He spelled his surname "Trevelyon" in the Folger Miscellany and "Trevilian" in the Wormsley Great Book. The "Trevelyon" spelling was established in scholarly literature by 1966, but the "Trevilian" spelling was used in the monograph published in 2000 that resulted in his name entering the Library of Congress Authority File for the first time.

Other than his own calligraphic rendering of his name, nothing approaching a portrait of Thomas Trevelyon exists. The drawing entitled "The author's apostrophe to the reader" once thought to be a self-portrait is, in fact, a stock figure illustrating a text bearing the title "The author's apostrophe to the reader" that Trevelyon copied out.

In 2000 Susan Shaw's Merrion Press created for the Roxburghe Club a facsimile copy of "The Great Book of Thomas Trevilian" in two volumes edited by Nicolas Barker. The book was to be given to the club's members and sold. A copy of Shaw's facsimile book in 2020 was on sale for £2,200. The seller claimed that it is "perhaps" the "greatest monument to the arts of the book at the turn of the twentieth century".
