= Acta Croatica =

Collection of Croatian medieval legal documents

Acta Croatica is a collection of Croatian medieval public and private legal documents written in Glagolitic, Cyrillic and Latin scripts, used for the study of Croatian medieval history and the history of the Croatian language.

== Description ==
The collection contains documents of Croatian medieval history from the beginning of 12th to the end of the fifteenth century. Its first edition was prepared by Ivan Kukuljević Sakcinski who published it in 1863 in the JAZU series Monumenta spectantia historiam Slavorum meridionalium (Vol. 1). The new edition of Acta Croatica was prepared by Đuro Šurmin who published it in 1898 in the Academy's series Monumenta historico-juridica Slavorum meridionalium (from 1100 to 1499, Vol 6, book 1).

Despite the enormous contribution to the study of Croatian medieval history, both editions of Acta Croatica do not conform to accepted scientific standards of critical publications of medieval sources. For example, Kukuljević-Sakcinski arbitrarily transliterated Latin script documents to Glagolitic script for which he felt that their originals were written in Glagolitic. In Šurmin's edition, which sought to be the corrected and updated edition of Kukuljević-Sakcinski's Acta Croatica, all of the Glagolitic and Latin script documents were printed in Cyrillic script.

Since both editions have a variety of diplomatic and linguistic errors, and readings are often unreliable and do not conform to modern principles of publishing critical editions of medieval documents, Yugoslav Academy decided to publish a new edition of Acta Croatica in accordance with critical palaeographic, linguistic, transliteration and diplomatic principles for publications of medieval sources. In 1917 this task was entrusted to the linguist Stjepan Ivšić, who critically processed much of the material, which was also expanded with newly discovered documents to 1541. Since the early 1970s, Ivšić's work was continued by Josip Bratulić and Miroslav Kurelac. The first volume of Acta Croatica, edited by Bratulić, was published in 2017.
