= Miscellany =

Publishing term; collection of various pieces of writing by different authors

Evoking both the muses and the encyclopedia in its title, Musapaedia aptly brings together a variety of poems and authors into a single volume.

A miscellany (UK: /mɪˈsɛləni/, US: /ˈmɪsəleɪni/) is a collection of various pieces of writing by different authors. Meaning a mixture, medley, or assortment, a miscellany can include pieces on many subjects and in a variety of different forms. In contrast to anthologies, whose aim is to give a selective and canonical view of literature, miscellanies were produced for the entertainment of a contemporary audience and so instead emphasise collectiveness and popularity. Laura Mandell and Rita Raley state:

This last distinction is quite often visible in the basic categorical differences between anthologies on the one hand, and all other types of collections on the other, for it is in the one that we read poems of excellence, the "best of English poetry," and it is in the other that we read poems of interest. Out of the differences between a principle of selection (the anthology) and a principle of collection (miscellanies and beauties), then, comes a difference in aesthetic value, which is precisely what is at issue in the debates over the "proper" material for inclusion into the canon.

Manuscript miscellanies are important in the Middle Ages, and are the sources for most surviving shorter medieval vernacular poetry. Medieval miscellanies often include completely different types of text, mixing poetry with legal documents, recipes, music, medical and devotional literature and other types of text, and in medieval contexts a mixture of types of text is often taken as a necessary condition for describing a manuscript as a miscellany. They may have been written as a collection, or represent manuscripts of different origins that were later bound together for convenience. In the early modern period miscellanies remained significant in a more restricted literary context, both in manuscript and printed forms, mainly as a vehicle for collections of shorter pieces of poetry, but also other works. Their numbers increased until their peak of importance in the 18th century, when over 1000 English poetry miscellanies were published, before the rise of anthologies in the early 19th century. The printed miscellany gradually morphed into the format of the regularly published magazine, and many early magazines used the word in their titles.

== Manuscript and printed miscellanies before the 18th century ==
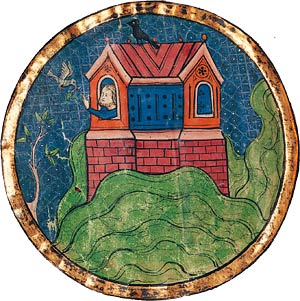
Miniature of Noah's Ark landing on the Mountains of Ararat (fol. 521a), from the 13th century North French Hebrew Miscellany

The broadest distinction is between manuscript and printed miscellanies. Manuscript miscellanies were carefully compiled by hand, but also circulated, consumed, and sometimes added to in this organic state – they were a prominent feature of 16th and early 17th century literary culture. Printed miscellanies, which evolved in the late 17th and 18th centuries, were compiled by editors and published by booksellers to make a profit. While manuscript miscellanies were produced by a small coterie of writers, and so were constructed around their own personal tastes, printed miscellanies were increasingly aimed towards a popular audience, and bear the marks of commercially driven, money making, opportunistic endeavours.

Multi-authored collections are known to exist in many forms – such as newspapers, magazines, or journals – and the act of commonplacing, of transcribing useful extracts and quotations from multiple sources is also well recorded. However, the formal production of literary miscellanies came into its established form in the 16th and 17th centuries, and reached a highpoint in the 18th century. Although literary miscellanies would often contain critical essays and extracts of prose or drama, their main focus was popular verse, often including songs. At this time poetry was still a dominant literary form, for both low and high literature, and its variety and accessibility further suited it to miscellaneous publication.

=== Medieval miscellanies ===
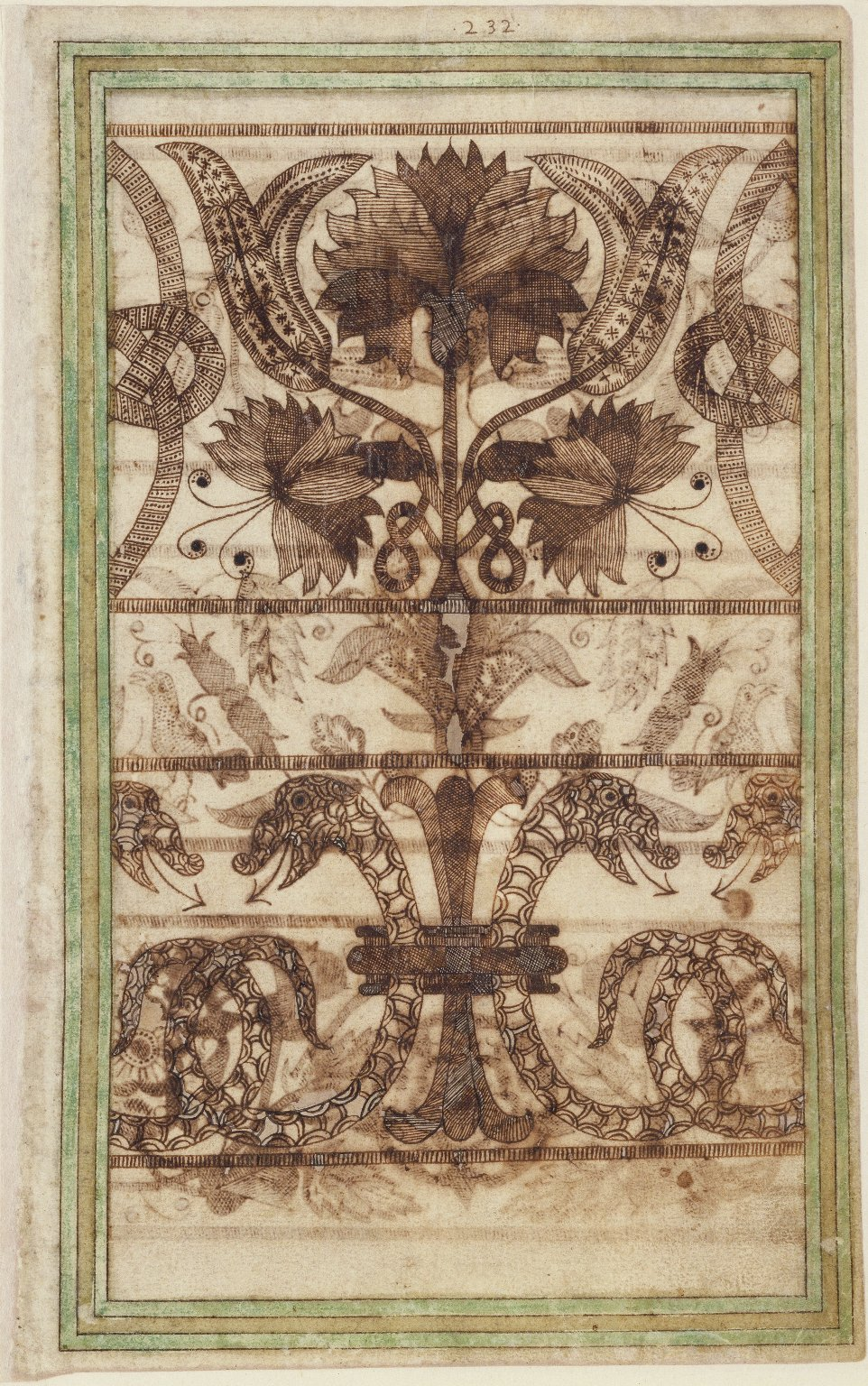
A patterned page from the Trevelyon Miscellany of 1608

Most medieval miscellanies include some religious texts, and many consist of nothing else. A few examples are given here to illustrate the range of material typically found. The Theological miscellany (British Library, MS Additional 43460) was made in late 8th century Italy with 202 folios of patristic writings in Latin. The 9th-century Irish Book of Armagh is also mostly in Latin but includes some of the earliest surviving Old Irish writing, as well as several texts on Saint Patrick, significant sections of the New Testament, and a 4th-century saint's Life. The Nowell Codex (BL Cotton Vitellius A. xv, ignoring a later volume bound in with it) is an Old English manuscript of about 1000 to 1010. It is famous for the only text of Beowulf but also includes a life of Saint Christopher, Wonders of the East (a description of various far-off lands and their fantastic inhabitants), a translation of a Letter of Alexander to Aristotle, and the poem Judith based on the Old Testament Book of Judith. It is one of the four Old English Poetic Codices from which the bulk of surviving Old English poetry comes, all of which can be classed as miscellanies.

The Lacnunga is a 10th or 11th century miscellany in Old English, Latin and Old Irish, with health-related texts taking a wide range of approaches, from herbal medicine and other medical procedures, to prayers and charms. The lavishly illuminated late 13th century North French Hebrew Miscellany contains mostly biblical and liturgical texts, but also legal material, over 200 poems, and calendars. The large 9th-century Chinese text Miscellaneous Morsels from Youyang, contains various Chinese and foreign legends and hearsay, reports on natural phenomena, short anecdotes, and tales of the wondrous and mundane, as well as notes on such topics as medicinal herbs and tattoos. The Trevelyon Miscellany of 1608, an oversized illustrated manuscript of 594 pages, depicts a wide range of subjects including herbal cures, biblical stories, a list of the mayors of London, proverbs, calendars, and embroidery patterns.

=== Verse miscellanies ===
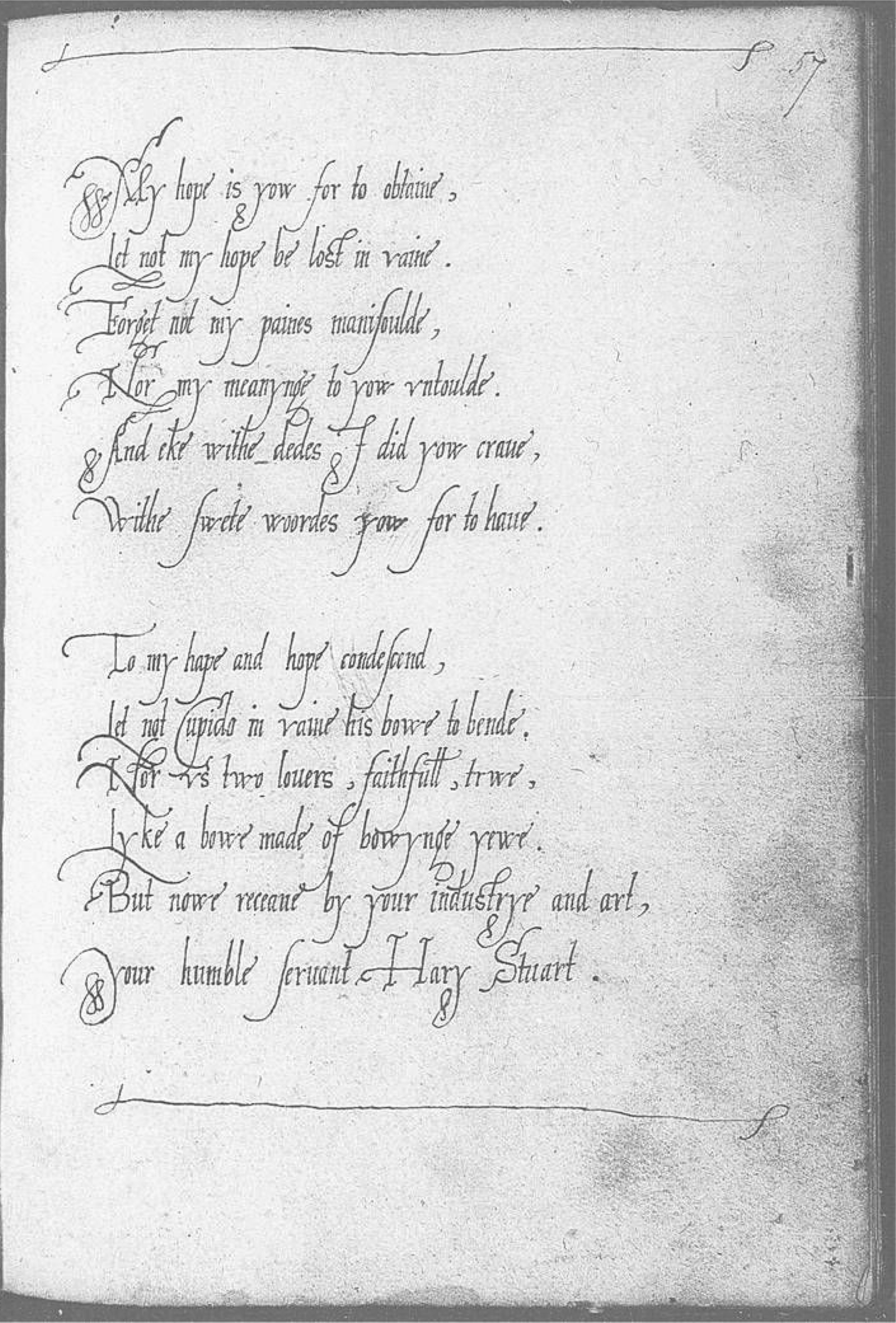
"My hope is yow for to obtaine". A love poem in a distinctive hand from The Devonshire Manuscript, 57r.

Verse miscellanies are collections of poems or poetic extracts that vary in authorship, genre, and subject matter. The earlier tradition of manuscript verse continued to be produced in the 16th century and onwards, and many of these early examples are preserved in national, state, and university libraries, as well as in private collections. The Devonshire Manuscript is a verse miscellany that was produced in the 1530s and early 1540s, and contains a range of works, from original pieces and fragments to translations and medieval verse. Compiled by three eminent women, it is one of the first examples of men and women collaborating on a literary work.

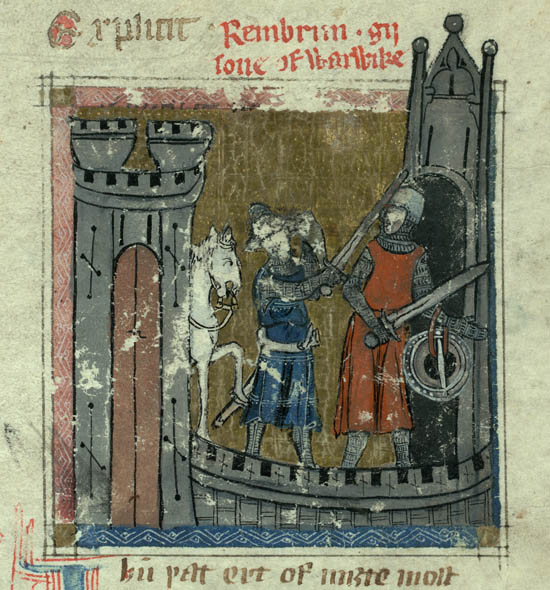
A drawing illustrating the medieval poem "Reinbroun" from the Auchinleck Manuscript.

Also prominent is the Arundel Harington manuscript, containing the writings of Sir Thomas Wyatt, Queen Elizabeth, and Sir Philip Sidney. Into the 17th century, the two Dalhousie Manuscripts are also of literary significance, as they contain the largest sustained contemporary collection of John Donne’s verse. Although fewer medieval verse miscellanies have been preserved, the Auchinleck Manuscript survives as a good example: it was produced in London in the 1330s and offers a rare snapshot of pre-Chaucerian Middle English poetry. However, most surviving manuscript verse miscellanies are from the 17th century:

[A]s far as ‘literary’ manuscripts are concerned, there are more surviving manuscripts from the seventeenth century than from the sixteenth: of the approximately 230 pre-1640 surviving manuscript collections of poetry that were not single-author collections only 27 belong to the sixteenth century.

Printed verse miscellanies arose in the latter half of the 16th century, during the reign of Elizabeth I (1558–1603). One of the most influential English Renaissance verse miscellanies was Richard Tottel’s Songes and Sonettes, now better known as Tottel's Miscellany. First printed in 1557, it ran into nine further editions before 1587; it was not then printed again until the 18th century. Although few new miscellanies emerged during the insurrectionary years of James I and Charles I (1603–1649), there was a resurgence of interest during the Restoration period and 18th century, and the vast majority of printed verse miscellanies originate from this latter period.

The poetry in these miscellanies varied widely in genre, form, and subject, and would frequently include: love lyrics, pastorals, odes, ballads, songs, sonnets, satires, hymns, fables, panegyrics, parodies, epistles, elegies, epitaphs, and epigrams, as well as translations into English and prologues and epilogues from plays. The practice of attributing poems in miscellanies was equally varied: sometimes editors would carefully identify authors, but most often the miscellaneous form would allow them to disregard conventions of authorship. Often authors were indicated by a set of initials, a partial name, or by reference to a previous poem "by the same hand"; equally often there were anonymous or pseudonymous attributions, as well as misattributions to other authors – or even made-up or deceased persons. Within a miscellany, editors and booksellers would often exercise considerable freedom in reproducing, altering, and extracting texts. Due to early copyright laws, lesser-known authors would regularly play no part in the printing process, receive no remuneration or royalties, and their works could be freely redistributed (and sometimes even pirated) once in the public domain.

== Development in the 18th century ==
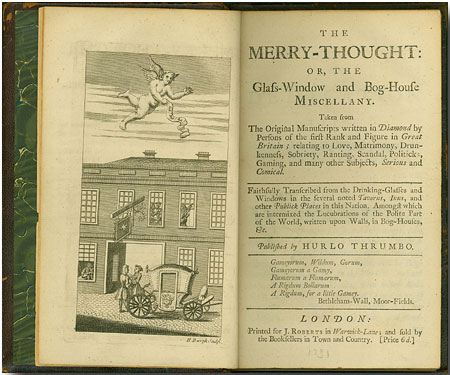
Frontispiece and title page to The Merry Thought: or, The Glass-Window and Bog-house Miscellany, which claimed to include "the Lucubrations of the Polite Part of the World, written upon walls, in Bog-Houses" such as the one at left of the tavern shown

Throughout the 18th century, the miscellany was the customary mode through which popular verse and occasional poetry would be printed, circulated, and consumed. Michael F. Suarez, one of the leading authorities on miscellanies, states:

The importance of printed miscellanies is evidenced by the fact that there are some 1,136 surviving verse miscellanies and anthologies (including reprints and separate issues, but excluding songbooks) for the seventy-five years from 1700 to 1774 – more than fifteen per annum.

Including songbooks, the New Cambridge Bibliography of English Literature lists almost 5000 verse miscellanies which were printed between 1701 and 1800. Due to the sheer number and variety of miscellanies printed in the 18th century, there are few generalizations that can be made about them. From the polite (Allan Ramsay’s The Tea-Table Miscellany, 1724–27) (Note: Google Books The Tea-Table Miscellany) to the partly obscene (The Merry Thought: or, The Glass-Window and Bog-house Miscellany, 1731–33) (Note: Gutenburg The Merry Thought: or, The Glass-Window and Bog-house Miscellany) the central purpose behind nearly all printed verse miscellanies was the reader’s entertainment. However, they were also marketed with practical purposes in mind: as educative moral guides (Miscellanies, Moral and Instructive, in Prose and Verse, 1787), (Note: Google Books Miscellanies, Moral and Instructive, in Prose and Verse) as repositories of useful information (A Miscellany of Ingenious Thoughts and Reflections in Verse and Prose, 1721–30), as elocutionary aids (William Enfield’s The Speaker, 1774–1820), (Note: Google Books The Speaker) and as guides for poetical composition (Edward Bysshe's The Art of English Poetry, 1702–62). (Note: Digital Miscellanies Index, The Art of English Poetry)

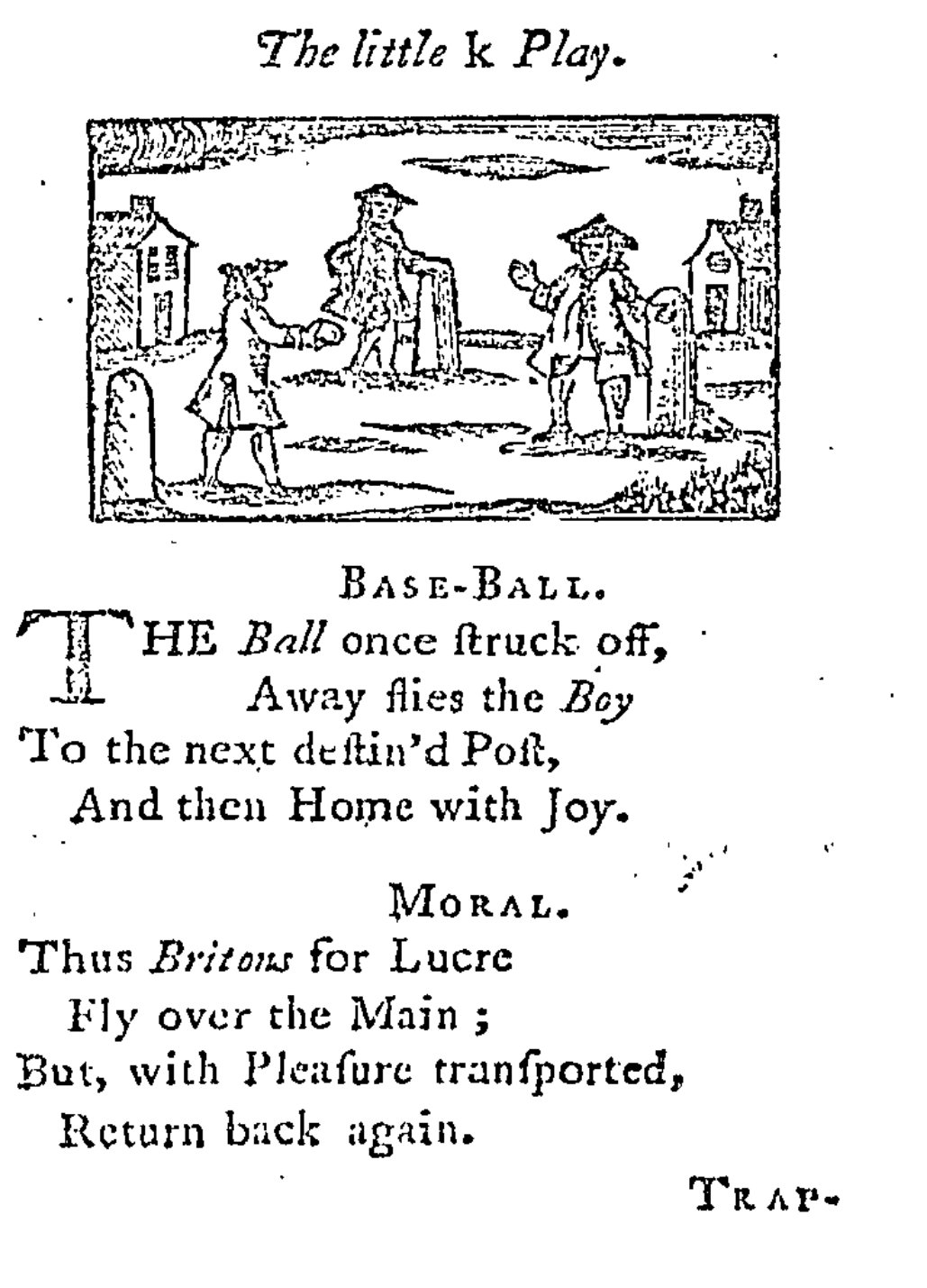
Some miscellanies were even aimed at children, as A Little Pretty Pocket-Book (1744) demonstrates. It consists of rhymes and morals for each letter of the alphabet.

=== Range of titles and audiences ===
In a competitive market the title of miscellanies was increasingly important. Without a specific selling-point, more generic complications would use catch-all titles as a tactic to familiarise themselves with a wide range of audiences and to appeal to a breadth of tastes. Titles could evoke the ornamental (The Bouquet: or Blossoms of Fancy, 1796), the medicinal (The Merry Companion: or, A Cure for the Spleen, 1730), the festive or feast (A Banquet of the Muses: or The Miscellany of Miscellanies, 1746), the curious (A Museum for Young Gentlemen and Ladies, 1751–82), (Note: Digital Miscellanies Index, A Museum for Young Gentlemen and Ladies) and the curatorial (The Foundling Hospital for Wit, 1743–64). (Note: Digital Miscellanies Index, The Foundling Hospital for Wit)

=== Variety and popularity ===
Despite these categorizations, miscellanies attempted to appeal to a wide audience by containing a variety of material for different tastes. Although an editor might orient the miscellany towards an intended audience, by nature of the variety of verse a much wider readership would have been possible. One-off, occasional miscellanies might prove popular and warrant further volumes or editions, such as political pamphlets (Poems on Affairs of State, 1689–1705), (Note: Google Books Poems on Affairs of State) resort-based works (Tunbrigalia: or the Tunbridge Miscellany, 1712–40), local productions (The Yorkshire Garland, 1788), (Note: Google Books The Yorkshire Garland) and courtly, coterie or collegiate collections (Thomas Warton’s The Oxford Sausage: or select poetical pieces written by the most celebrated wits of the University of Oxford, 1764–80). (Note: Google Books The Oxford Sausage)

=== Print trade and piracy ===
Often the commercial success of a miscellany would stimulate the publication of similarly titled, parasitic, and even entirely pirated works. Dublin booksellers, outside the jurisdiction of the Statute of Anne (1710) which had established copyright in England, could legally reproduce any popular miscellany that they thought would make a profit. Robert Dodsley’s hugely popular Collection of Poems by Several Hands (1748) (Note: Google Books Collection of Poems by Several Hands) was copied entirely by Dublin booksellers in 1751, though it also underwent other, more minor piracies in the English literary market – such as unauthorized continuations, supplements, or companion texts attempting to exploit the reputation of the original.

== The decline of verse miscellanies ==
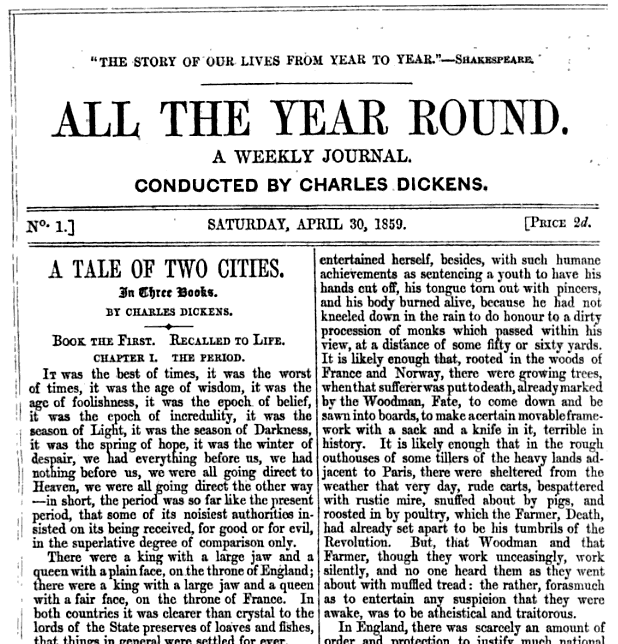
The famous opening lines of A Tale of Two Cities in the periodical All the Year Round

=== Changing tastes and technology ===
Although poetry maintained cultural pre-eminence for most of the 18th century, it was at the same time retreating before the advance of prose, and particularly the rise of the novel, as the new dominant form of literary expression in the West. The decline of poetry as the most widely printed format is also partly technological. Lee Erickson argues:

Once the materials and means of printing became cheaper, diffuse prose was no longer at a comparative economic disadvantage with compressed poetry. The periodical format, in particular, gave rise to a variety of shorter prose forms that competed for and largely won over the audience for poetry.

Miscellanies however remained popular throughout the 19th century, especially what came to be known as the “weekly news miscellany, which typically appeared at the weekend and featured not only a summary of the week’s intelligence but also a variety of instructive and entertaining matter”, in other words what we call today a magazine, but poetry was no longer privileged among these publications. Verse miscellanies slowly died out in the Victorian era, as literary miscellanies made possible the serial publication of novels, such as William Harrison Ainsworth’s Jack Sheppard (1839–40) or Charles Dickens’ A Tale of Two Cities (1859) which was published in 31 weekly instalments in his literary periodical All the Year Round. There were few, if any, miscellanies devoted to poetry. Instead, verse would be the minority of content, to provide variety from the extensive prose:

[S]erial fiction became an increasingly popular ingredient of these miscellanies, [but] the syndicators often began by supplying metropolitan advertising and intelligence, and soon also provided regular features such as poetry and critical essays, or columns aimed at women and children.

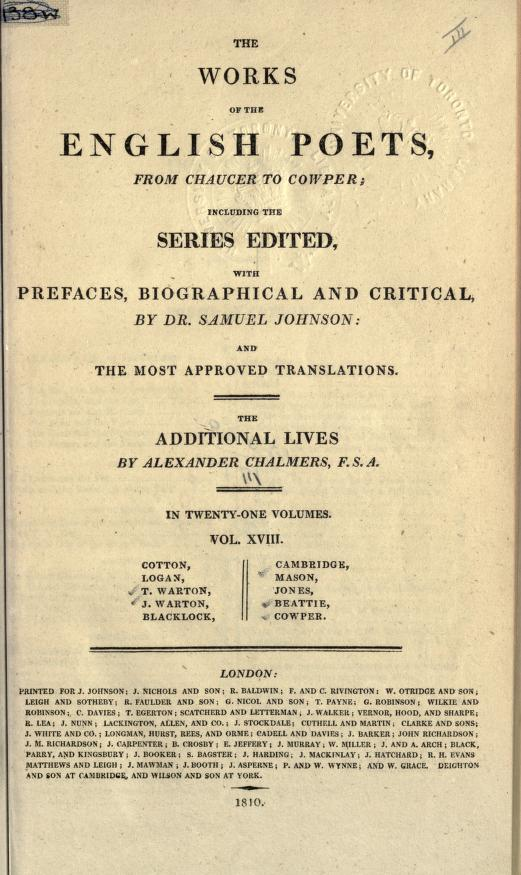
Title page of Alexander Chalmers' Works of the English Poets, volume 18.

=== Succession of the anthology ===
In the wake of collections such as Robert Anderson’s Works of the British Poets (thirteen vols., 1792–1795) and Alexander Chalmers’ Works of the English Poets (twenty-one vols., 1810), anthologies were increasingly adopted for the publication of assorted poems. Barbara M. Benedict argues:

As readers and publishers matured in the eighteenth century, however, another form appeared that challenged the dominance of the miscellany: the ‘anthology’, a comprehensive selection of the best fashionable verse.

Printing technologies and the rise of the novel played an important role in reshaping the nature of miscellanies, as did changing ideas about the native literary canon. Attempts to construct a credible canon of English verse had been ongoing since the early 18th century, and with its success the place of poetry was determined by the advent of authoritative anthologies which claimed to represent the very best of the English poetic tradition.

== Significance and recognition ==
In contrast to anthologies, whose aim is to give a canonical history of literature, miscellanies tend to reflect the dynamic literary culture of the time in which they were produced. As Michael F. Suarez states:

Miscellanies are usually compilations of relatively recent texts designed to suit contemporary tastes; anthologies, in contrast, are generally selections of canonical texts which have a more established history and a greater claim to cultural importance. The miscellany, then, typically celebrates – and indeed constructs – taste, novelty and contemporaneity in assembling a synchronous body of material. It should be distinguished from the anthology, which honours – and perpetuates – the value of historicity and the perdurance of established canons of artistic discrimination in gathering texts recognized for their aesthetic legitimacy.

There are modifications to this definition, such as the argument that miscellanies could contain elements that might be considered anthological (the inclusion of classical literary pieces for example) or could be republished years later when their original contents had matured in literary value. Suarez also notes that eighteenth-century miscellanies often contained "extracts from a variety of single-author publications" and, furthermore, that "many miscellanies appropriated select pieces from earlier poetry collections, thus forming what were essentially anthologies of miscellanies."

=== The literary marketplace ===
It is generally accepted that miscellanies offer insight into the popular taste of the moment, of what people read and how they read it; yet they also provide information about the aesthetic, social and economic concerns underlying the production and consumption of literature. Miscellanies were assembled, marketed and sold with a contemporary reading audience in mind, and reveal a dynamic between the taste which they played a part in shaping, and the preoccupations of the editors who compiled and the publishers who sold them. Indeed, the range of price and format reveals the extent to which poetry was packaged and sold for different readerships. As Jennifer Batt argues:

The contents and omissions, the packaging and marketing, the publication history, and the reception history of every verse collection produced in the 18th century reveals how literary culture was conceived of by its creators and how those creators wished to intervene in the literary marketplace.

Miscellanies frequently placed emphasis on variety, novelty and fashionability, providing their readers with a range of different pieces by various writers, but also keeping them abreast of the newest developments in the literary market. They are a prime demonstration of early marketing and advertising techniques in literature.

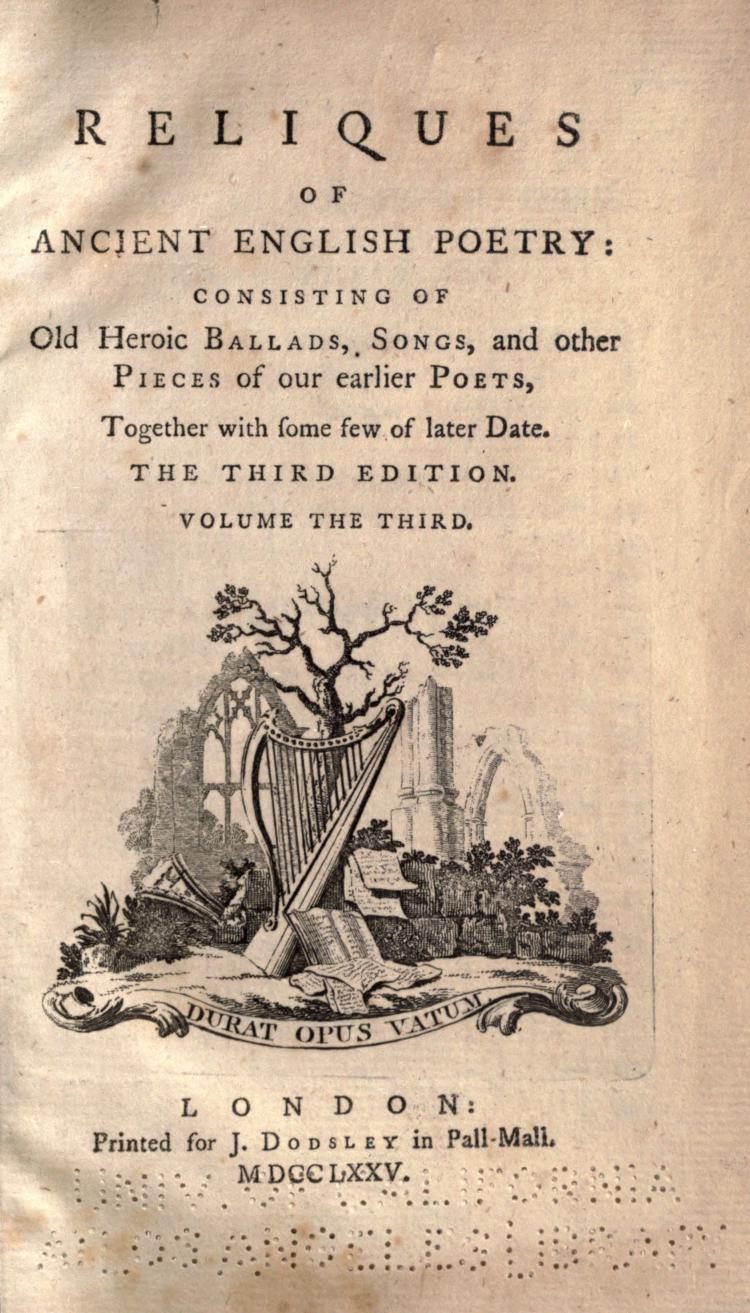
The title page and distinctive ornament of Percy's Reliques.

=== Contemporary importance and influence ===
Miscellanies were an influential literary form at the time. From the beginning of the 18th century, verse miscellanies were gathering together a selection of poetic works by different authors, past and present, and so played a part in the development of the concept of the English canon. These literary miscellanies might be sold as unique collections, arising from the combinations of writers in a small literary circle; or their function could attempt to be more national and historical, by representing the finest works of British poets to date. The multiple editions of the Dryden-Tonson Miscellany Poems (1684–1708) (Note: Digital Miscellanies Index, Miscellany Poems) and the Swift-Pope Miscellanies (1727–32), (Note: Google Books Miscellanies) as well as The Muses Library (1737) (Note: Google BooksThe Muses Library) and The British Muse (1738), (Note: Google Books The British Muse) were from early on attempting to construct a notion of a national literary heritage. The revival of interest in English balladry is also largely due to miscellanies, most famously Thomas Percy’s Reliques of Ancient English Poetry (1765). (Note: Google Books Reliques of Ancient English Poetry) Miscellanies also played a part in the development of other literary forms, particularly the novel. Since so many collections included prose extracts alongside poetry, often from eighteenth-century novels such as Laurence Sterne's Tristram Shandy (1759), it is arguable they aided the popularisation of novels. Leah Price’s The Anthology and the Rise of the Novel (2000), in particular, discusses the relationship between miscellanies and prose fiction in the latter half of the 18th century.

=== Submerged voices and marginal writing ===
Because of the variety and novelty they emphasise, as well as the anonymity of authorship they could offer, miscellanies often enabled the inclusion and so expression of more submerged voices, such as those of women, and more marginal forms of writing, such as the comic, the curious, and the crude. As Dustin Griffin has noted:

For most other poets, women especially, publication in a miscellany was the only way in which their work might reach the public. Many other ephemeral satirical poems, circulating as broadsheets or in manuscript, were gathered in the successive editions of Poems on Affairs of State (1689–1705).

Many miscellanies contained exclusively the writing of women, most famously Poems by Eminent Ladies (1755) (Note: Google Books Poems by Eminent Ladies) – a collection of verse by 18 women poets including Aphra Behn, Elizabeth Carter, Mary Leapor, Anne Finch, Katherine Philips, Margaret Cavendish, Mary Monck, Lady Mary Chudleigh, and Mary Barber – and recently critics have brought to light the ways in which such women made a key contribution to the miscellany culture of the 18th century. The Perdita Project provides the fullest evidence of women’s role in manuscript miscellanies in the period 1500–1700.

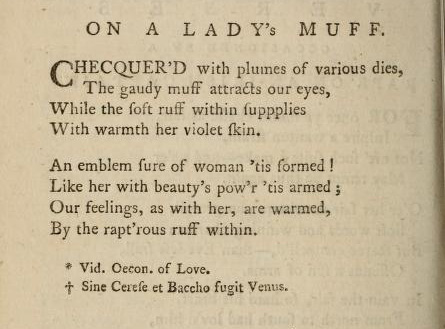
At the other extreme, a sexually objectifying poem from The Fugitive Miscellany playing euphemistically on a ladies' fashion accessory, the "muff".

Miscellanies also presented themselves as performing an important cultural or curatorial role, by preserving unbound sheets, fragments and ephemera which otherwise would have been lost – and thus offering a unique insight into the vibrant literary life of the 18th century. A prime example of such curiosity-shop publications is The fugitive miscellany: a collection of fugitive pieces in prose and verse (1774), (Note: Internet Archive The fugitive miscellany. Being a collection of such fugitive pieces, in prose and verse, as are not in any other collection. With many pieces never before published. 2 vols. (London, 1774). ESTC T118867) which includes nonsense rhymes, epitaphs, inscriptions, poems made out of newspaper cuttings, as well as wills written in verse. Late twentieth-century criticism has drawn attention to the cultural and literary importance of these non-canonical, lesser-known and ephemeral kinds of popular verse – such as the recent discovery of a poem spuriously attributed to John Milton, "An Extempore upon a Faggot". As the most prolific source of anonymous or pseudonymous publication, miscellanies provide insight into the unconventional history of English literature. Roger Lonsdale notes in his influential anthology, The New Oxford Book of Eighteenth-Century Verse (1984): "One of the most interesting poets [from this period] is the ubiquitous ‘Anonymous’, whose voice almost never registers in conventional literary history". Crucially, he suggests that we would know more about "the landscape of eighteenth-century poetry" if more attention was paid to "the innumerable miscellanies by several hands".

== Literary criticism and research projects ==
It is now widely accepted by literary critics that paying attention to forms of access to literature, and to the reception history of individual works and authors, is an important part of the history of literary culture. In this context, the miscellany has grown rapidly in interest in eighteenth-century studies. As Jennifer Batt states:

The study of miscellanies has become vibrant in recent years, encouraged by controversies about canon formation as well as by the growth of interest in reception history, the history of reading and the history of the book.

In light of such developments there have arisen projects attempting to make the vast number and array of verse miscellanies more accessible to modern researchers and readers, most prominently through the process of online digitization. In 2012 Verse Miscellanies Online was launched, which offers a searchable critical edition of seven printed verse miscellanies published in the 16th and early 17th centuries. While some projects focus on creating online editions of the most significant verse miscellanies, others have attempted to arrange a corpus of miscellanies produced in set periods, such as Scriptorium: Medieval and Early Modern Manuscripts Online (2006-2009), a digital archive of manuscript miscellanies and commonplace books from c. 1450-1720. The largest undertaking by far has been The Digital Miscellanies Index, an ongoing project funded by the Leverhulme Trust. The Index seeks to create a freely available online database of the 1000-plus verse miscellanies published in the 18th century, based on a comprehensive bibliography compiled by Michael F. Suarez, and supplied by the world’s single largest collection of miscellanies held in The Bodleian Library’s Harding Collection. Begun in 2010, this project was successfully completed in September 2013. The database is currently available in a beta version.

== See also ==
- 18th century in literature
- Commonplace books
- Digital humanities
- Florilegium
- History of the book
- Manuscripts
- Muraqqa
- Street literature
- Miscellanea (Guénon-book)
- Book series
- Volume (bibliography)
- Collection (publishing)

== Additional resources ==
- Blatt, Heather. "Describing Miscellanies in Late Medieval English Wills." Huntington Library Quarterly 85, no. 4 (2022): 683-704.
- Ferry, Anne, Tradition and the Individual Poem: An Inquiry Into Anthologies (Stanford, Calif.: Stanford University Press, 2001).
- Hamrick, Stephen ‘Tottel's Miscellany and the English Reformation’ Criticism 44 (2002), 329–61.
- Hughey, Ruth, The Arundel Harington manuscript of English poetry, 2 vols. (Columbus: Ohio State University Press, 1960).
- O'Callaghan, Michelle, ‘Textual Gatherings: Print, Community and Verse Miscellanies in Early Modern England’ in Early Modern Culture 8 (2010).
- Pomeroy, Elizabeth, ‘The Elizabethan Miscellanies: Their Developments and Conventions’, English Studies 36 (1973), 1–145.
- Southall, Raymond, ‘The Devonshire Manuscript Collection of Early Tudor Poetry, 1532–1541’, Review of English Studies n.s. 15 (1964), 142–150.
- Sullivan, Ernest W. Jr (ed.), First and Second Dalhousie Manuscripts: poems and prose by John Donne and others (Columbia: University of Missouri Press, 1988).
