= Sonja Smolec =

Croatian artist, writer, and poet (born 1953)

Sonja Smolec (born 1953) is a Croatian artist, writer, and poet.

== Biography ==
Smolec was born in Pula, Croatia. From 1956 to 1985, she lived in Zagreb and Velika Gorica and currently resides in Pula.

Smolec was, at one time, a member of the art group '69', but eventually neglected her interest in painting due to family commitments.

Since February 2004, Smolec became a member of the Society of Writers for children and youth, Croatia. She is also member of DHK Društvo hrvatskih književnika.

== Works - Books for children and youth ==
- Tajna ima krila - collection of stories, 2002 - Publisher: Szabo A3 Data, ISBN 953-6442-40-X
- Kamen Tvrtko - collection of stories - e-book, 2006 - Naklada Spark, Velika Gorica, Hrvatska, ISBN 978-953-99293-4-1
- Kamen Tvrtko - collection of stories, 2008 - Lulu, USA, ISBN 978-1-4092-3601-6
- Kineski zvončići - novel for children, 2008 - Publisher: Albatros, Velika Gorica, Croatia, ISBN 978-953-612-7-597
- The Girl with Pink Glasses - novel for children written in English, Publisher AG Press, USA 2010, ISBN 978-14507-0752-7
- Halo, Zemlja zove Snježanu! - novel for children and youth, 2010 - Publisher: Alfa, Zagreb, Croatia, ISBN 978-953-297-267-2)
- Der Stein Hartwig (German) - collection of stories, 2013, Publisher R. G. Fischer Verlag, Frankfurt am Main, Germany, ISBN 978-3-8301-9844-4
- The Girl with Pink Glasses - novel for children written in Croatian, 2013 - Publisher: Kalliopa, Našice, Croatia, ISBN 978-953-7535-179
- Moja sestra Sarah (My sister Sarah) - novel for youth, 2015. - Publisher: Croatian Association of Writers for Children and Youth, First Writers Club, Biblioteka Velika, Zagreb, Hrvatska, ISBN 978-953-7190-43-9
- Moja polovica Mjeseca - novel for youth, 2017. Naklada Bošković, Split, ISBN 978-953-263-384-9
- Prva klupa do prozora - novel for youth, 2017. Naklada Bošković, Split, ISBN 978-953-263-394-8
- Marama s bubamarama - novel for youth and children 2017. Naklada Semafora, Biblioteka Zelena, Zagreb, ilustracije Sanja Pribić, ISBN 978-953-7341-909
- Da ti nije palo na pamet!- novel for youth, 2018. Naklada Bošković, Split, ISBN 978-953-263-435-8
- Malena i Klepetan,- picture book, 2018. Izdanja Antibarbarus, Zagreb, ISBN 978953-249-174-6
- Zefir, - novel for youth, 2019. Naklada Bošković, Split, ISBN 978-953-263-486-0
- Predskazivač, - novel for youth, 2019. Book one, Naklada T.I.M. Rijeka ISBN 978-953-7780-76-0
- Predskazivač, - novel for youth, 2020. Book two, Naklada T.I.M. Rijeka ISBN 978-953-7780-78-4
- Priče iz sobe na kraju hodnika, novel for youth, 2021. Naklada T.I.M. Rijeka ISBN 978-953-7780-90-6
- Povedi me kući, novel for youth, Naklada Bošković, Split, ISBN 978-953-263-759-5

== Books for adults ==
- Ada - novela, 2018. Naklada Bošković, Split, ISBN 978-953-263-433-4
- Kutija s mirisom jorgovana - Djetinjstvo na dlanu, autobiography, 2024. Publisher: Društvo za promicanje kulture "Kvaka", Velika Gorica, ISBN 978-953-8417-29-0

== Awards ==
Smolec has won the first prize for short stories in English, an international competition run by the highly prestigious El Museo de la Palabra, Spain. As part of the ceremonies, the winners have met Princess Letizia, the future Spanish Queen. * Letizia, Princess of Asturias. 19 June 2014 – present: Her Majesty The Queen

Awarded story: "Night Howl" *

Official site of his majesty, Don Juan Carlos, King of Spain *

Museo de la Palabra, Quero, Toledo, Spain *

In the Webstilus Association competition, she won the award for the most beautiful poetry collection for 2014 - "Roots". The Webstilus Association has published her an award-winning collection.

On 7 June 2018, Smolec has won the first prize named after the Croatian writer "Mato Lovrak" for the best novel written for children and youth "Marama s Bubamarama", published by "Semafora", Zagreb, Croatia.
