= An Extempore upon a Faggot =

"An Extempore upon a Faggot" is an eight-line poem of unknown authorship dating from the mid-17th century. It has been attributed to John Wilmot, 2nd Earl of Rochester, John Dryden, John Milton, and Sir John Suckling.

In September 2010, Jennifer Batt, lecturer in English at Jesus College, Oxford, published a version of the poem found in the 1708 Oxford and Cambridge Miscellany Poems, part of the Harding Collection at the Bodleian Library. The original anthology attributes this version to John Milton.

== Poem verses ==
Have you not in a Chimney seen
A Faggot which is moist and green;
How coyly it receives the Heat,
And at both ends do's weep and sweat?
So fares it with a tender Maid,
When first upon her Back she's laid;
But like dry Wood th' experienc'd Dame
Cracks and rejoices in the Flame.
