= Attempted assassination of Nikola Štedul =

The shooting of Nikola Štedul was an attempted assassination in Kirkcaldy, Scotland in 1988.

The victim, Nikola Štedul, was a Croatian emigrant from what was then Yugoslavia. He had been the president of the Croatian Statehood Movement, campaigning for Croatian independence from Yugoslavia. Vinko Sindičić arrived in the UK in mid-October 1988, traveling on a falsified Swiss passport. In the early morning of 20 October while Štedul was walking his dog, Sindičić shot at him six times.

Štedul survived the shooting and Sindičić was arrested at Heathrow Airport. The Yugoslav embassy subsequently provided an alibi for Sindičić, saying he was visiting Scotland to watch a football match between Scotland and Yugoslavia—the World Cup qualifier was played in Glasgow on 19 October. However, firearm residue was found on Sindičić's skin and following an eleven-day trial, he was found guilty of attempted murder and sentenced to 15 years in jail. The assassination attempt was subject of a 1994 movie by Scottish Television, The Yugoslav Hitman.

Štedul died in Croatia in 2022.

== See also ==
- Stjepan Đureković
- Directorate for State Security
