= Ribnjak =

Ribnjak may refer to:

- Ribnjak, Zagreb, a neighborhood and park in Zagreb, Croatia
- Ribnjak, Novi Sad, a neighborhood in Novi Sad, Serbia
- Tivoli Pond, a pond in Tivoli Park in Ljubljana, Slovenia
- Ribnjak, Koprivnica-Križevci County, a village near Rasinja, Croatia
