= Vinko Sindičić =

Former Yugoslavian UDBA agent

- Born: 29 September 1943 (age 83); Stara Baška, Krk, Croatia
- Known for: Attempted Assassination of Nikola Štedul

Vinko Sindičić (born 29 September 1943) is a former UDBA agent.

== Biography ==
Vinko Sindičić was born in the town of Stara Baška on the island of Krk on the 29th of September 1943. As a child, Sindičić was enrolled and graduated from an eight-year elementary school. He then enrolled in the Tourism and Hotel Management School in Opatija. Sindičić then moved overseas, moving from Croatia to Italy where he married, then moved to Germany.

In 1988, Sindičić was in the United Kingdom where on the early morning of October 20, he shot Nikola Štedul six times – four times near the spine and two times in the mouth. Sindičić claimed he was in the United Kingdom for a World Cup Qualifying football match between Scotland and Yugoslavia however, gun residue was found on Sindičić's skin therefore incriminating him. Sindičić was later found guilty of the attempted assassination of Nikola Štedul and served 15 years in prison. Sindičić's story inspired the episode of Crime Story, The Yugoslav Hitman by Scottish Television.

After serving his sentence, Sindičić requested to be extradited to Croatia to face charges against him for the killing of Bruno Bušić. He was extradited and was imprisoned in Remetinec Prison, Zagreb for one year before his trial at the District Court of Zagreb. He was found not guilty and the Supreme Court of Croatia upheld the verdict in 2005.

In 2008, Sindičić delivered testimony in Munich against Krunoslav Prates. This testimony led to the extraditions of Josip Perković and Zdravko Mustač in 2015, with both being later sentenced to life in prison.

Sindičić was later arrested in Burgos, Spain by the Spanish Law Enforcement for supposedly lying in his testimonies in Munich. However, the Spanish Government refused to extradite him to Croatia for prosecution as the Spanish Government believed that as the testimony happened in Germany, the Croatian Government had no case to further chase Sindičić.
