= Stjepan Đureković =

Croatian political dissident and businessman (1926-1983)

- Born: 8 August 1926; Bukovac, Kingdom of Serbs, Croats and Slovenes
- Died: 28 July 1983 (aged 56); Wolfratshausen, West Germany
- Cause of death: Assassination by gunshot
- Burial place: Mirogoj Cemetery, Zagreb, Croatia
- Occupation: Businessman

Stjepan Đureković (8 August 1926 – 28 July 1983) was a Croatian political dissident and businessman who was assassinated by the Yugoslavian State Security Administration (UDBA) in West Germany in 1983. He was previously the CEO of the state-owned INA petrol company. In 1982, he defected to West Germany and became active in Croatian émigré circles opposed to Yugoslavia.

== Early life ==
Đureković was born in Bukovac near Petrovaradin. During World War II he avoided service in the Independent State of Croatia's armed forces to join the Partisans.

== Business career in FPR/SFR Yugoslavia ==
After the war he rose to a position within INA.

== Relocation to West Germany ==
After falling out with the government he defected to West Germany in 1982 where he became involved with the Croatian National Committee, an Ustaše-linked organization. Together with Ivan Botić he published Yugoslavia in crisis, in which the two argued that Yugoslavia's large inflation rate and unemployment was resulting in the exploitation of Croatian resources.

=== Assassination ===
Đureković was assassinated in Wolfratshausen, West Germany by UDBA agents in 1983 in "Operation Dunav". Đureković's remains were reburied at Zagreb's Mirogoj cemetery in 1999.

In 2005, Germany issued an arrest warrant on Josip Perković for his involvement in the assassination. Krunoslav Prates was also put on trial on charges relating to the crime.

The German court trying Prates threatened to take action against Croatian officials who obstructed testimony at the trial, including Croatian president Stjepan Mesić. In 2008, Krunoslav Prates was sentenced to life in prison for his role in the assassination.

In 2009, Germany's Federal Criminal Police Office issued warrants for Zdravko Mustač, Ivan Cetinić, Ivan Lasić and Boris Brnelić for involvement in the murder as members of the UDBA. In October 2009, German police arrested Luka Sekula, a Croat with Swedish citizenship, for participation in the murder.

On 1 January 2014, Josip Perković was arrested in Zagreb. His trial began in Germany in mid-2014. In August 2016, both Perković and Zdravko Mustač were proclaimed guilty in a first-instance verdict and sentenced to life imprisonment for abetting the murder of Đureković.

== Publications ==
- Ja, Josip Broz-Tito: roman, 1982.
- Kako Jugoslavija pljačka Hrvatsku, poslije 1982.
- Komunizam: velika prevara, 1982.
- Sinovi orla = Bijt’ e Shqiponjës: roman, 1982.
- Slom ideala: (ispovijed Titovog ministra): roman, 1982., New York, 1983.
- Crveni menageri, Washington, 1983.
- Yugoslavia in crisis: the political and economic dimensions, New York, 1983. (suautor Ivan Botić)
- Yugoslavia’s energy crisis, 1983.

== See also ==
- State Security Service
