= Ribnjak, Novi Sad =

Ribnjak Рибњак
- Suburban settlement
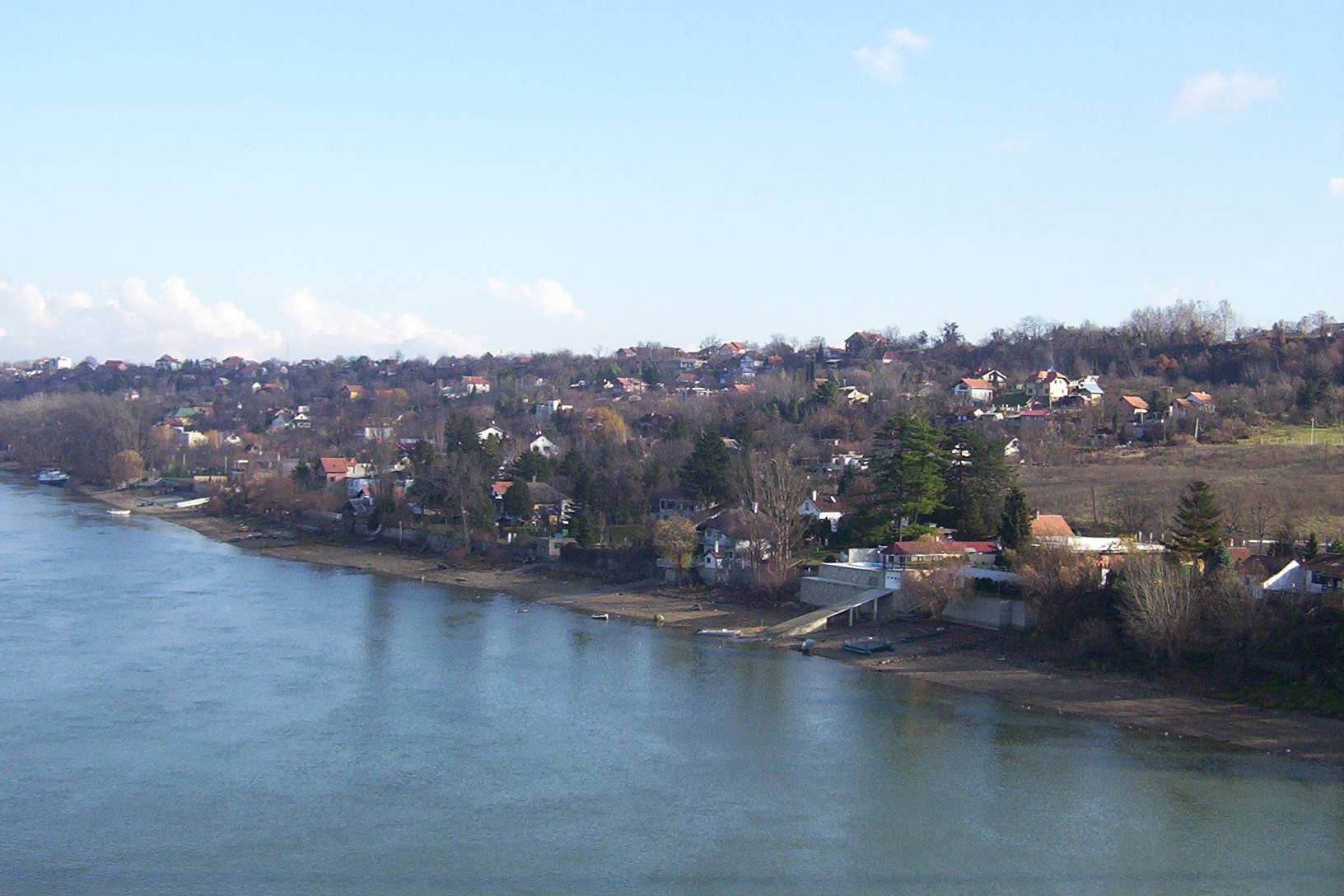
- View of Ribnjak from Liberty Bridge
- Country: Serbia
- Province: Vojvodina
- District: South Bačka
- Municipality: Novi Sad
- Time zone: UTC+1 (CET)
  - Summer (DST): UTC+2 (CEST)
- Area code: +381(0)21
- Car plates: NS

Ribnjak (Serbian Cyrillic: Рибњак) is a small neighborhood of the city of Novi Sad, Serbia.

== Name ==
Its name is derived from the Serbian word "riba" ("fish" in English). In English, the word "ribnjak" means fishfarm.

== Geography ==
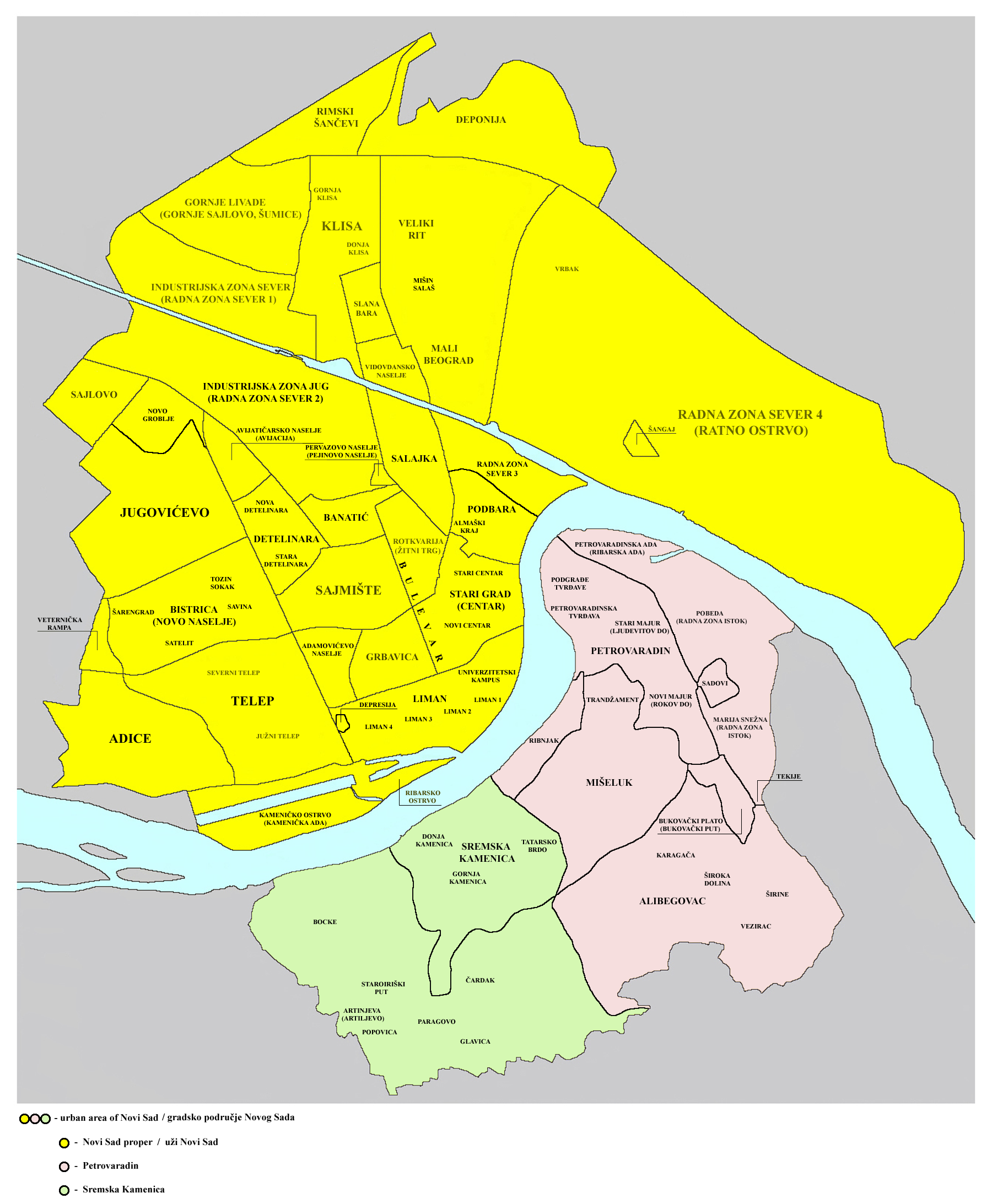
Map of the urban area of Novi Sad with city quarters, showing the location of Ribnjak

The neighborhood is located on the Danube river, in the Syrmian part of Novi Sad, between Liberty Bridge and the Petrovaradin fortress, overlooking the Štrand and Liman neighborhood across the river.

Ribnjak is situated on the slope hills between the Mišeluk and Trandžament neighborhoods in the east, the river Danube in the west, Sremska Kamenica in the south, and the Petrovaradin fortress in the north. Because the neighborhood is located on a slope, this area is subject to landslides, but they are not severe and are very slow in progress. There are two main roads in the neighborhood, the Lower and Upper Ribnjak Roads. In spring, when the waters of the Danube river rise, the Lower Road and a few houses near the river get flooded.

On the top of the hill (the border of Mišeluk and Trandžament neighborhoods) is a road which connects Sremska Kamenica and Petrovaradin. In the lower part of the neighborhood, a road links Donja Kamenica and Kamenički Park under the Liberty Bridge to Petrovaradin fortress and Varadin Bridge.

== Features ==
Although it is prone to landslides and flooding, Ribnjak is an attractive neighborhood, thanks to its close distance to the city centre of Novi Sad, Sremska Kamenica and Petrovaradin. It also has beautiful scenic views of Novi Sad. There are approximately 500 people living in Ribnjak, all in residential houses.

== Transportation ==
The upper part of Ribnjak is connected to the rest of the city by bus line 70, which goes from the railway station, through Banatić, Adamovićevo Naselje, Liman, Stari Grad, Petrovaradin and up to the Sremska Kamenica Institute.

== See also ==
- Neighborhoods of Novi Sad
