= Josip Perković =

Croatian secret police member

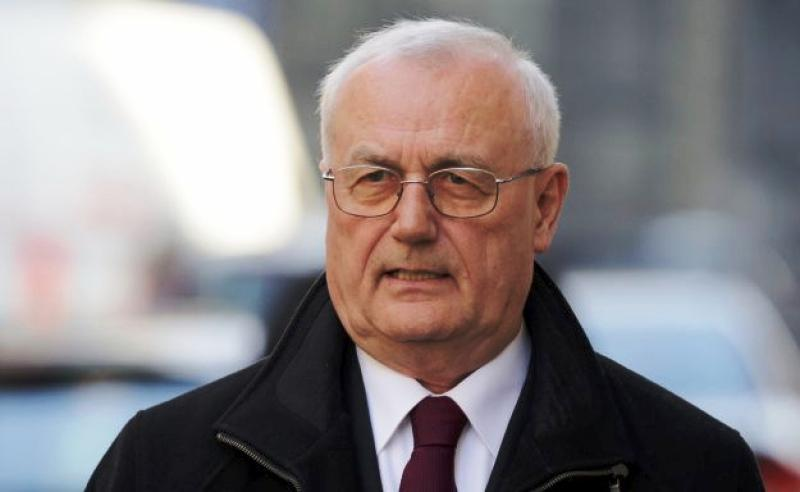
- Josip Perković in 2014
- Born: 17 May 1945 (age 81); Ličko Novo Selo, FS Croatia, DF Yugoslavia
- Occupations: Director, State Security Service
- Criminal penalty: Life imprisonment; commuted to 30 years imprisonment

Josip Perković (Croatian pronunciation: [jǒsip perkoʋit͡ɕ]; born 17 May 1945) is a former director of the Yugoslav-era Croatian secret police, the State Security Service (Služba državne sigurnosti, SDS), (Note: The State Security Service (SDB or SDS) was the federal secret police of Yugoslavia. At all times the secret police was best known by its old acronym UDBA, which is derived from the initials of its original name in the Serbian variant of the Serbo-Croatian language: Uprava državne bezbednosti (armije) (meaning "State Security Administration (of the Army)"). In its latter decades, it was composed of six semi-independent secret police organizations (of the same name) for each one of the six Yugoslav federal republics – coordinated by the central federal office. Perković belonged to the Croatian organization.) convicted in 2016 in Germany to life in prison for his involvement in the 1983 assassination of Croat émigré Stjepan Đureković.

== Career ==
Perković was born in Ličko Novo Selo near Našice in eastern Croatia. After earning a university degree in economics, he started working for a local SDS office in Osijek in January 1970. In September 1979 he was transferred to Zagreb and put in charge of the department dealing with Croatian émigrés abroad. Perković continued to rise through the SDS ranks and was appointed the assistant to the interior minister of Socialist Republic of Croatia in 1986, becoming head of the entire Croatian branch of SDS.

Following the 1990 multiparty election, Perković continued working at the Croatian Interior Ministry and was named undersecretary for state security in April 1990. In 1991 he was transferred to the Defence Ministry, upon explicit request by Gojko Šušak, himself a former émigré who had returned from Canada and who was at the time Minister of Emigration in the Cabinet of Franjo Gregurić.

In 1992, Perković was abruptly relieved of his duty after a film implicating him in the 1978 murder of Bruno Bušić in Paris was aired on national television. However, he was soon rehabilitated by Šušak (who in the meantime became Minister of Defence) who appointed him as his advisor at the defence ministry. In 1996, he was transferred to the newly formed Croatian Intelligence Agency (HIS), where he taught at the agency's internal training centre, before retiring in 1998.

== Extradition ==
In 2005, the Federal Criminal Police of Germany issued a warrant for Perković's arrest, over his alleged implication in the 1983 assassination of émigré Stjepan Đureković in Wolfratshausen, Bavaria. The allegations of Perković's involvement were mentioned in the 2008 trial of Krunoslav Prates. Prates was charged with accessory to murder of Đureković, convicted, and sentenced to life imprisonment by a Munich court in July 2008.

As the Croatian Constitution prevents extradition of Croatian citizens to other countries, Perković continued to live freely in Croatia even after the 2009 arrest warrant, as it had been issued by Germany. However, the warrant was to become legally binding for Croatian authorities in 2013, as the European Arrest Warrant (EAW) issued by Germany for Perković came into force with Croatia's accession to the European Union on 1 July 2013, allowing extradition of wanted individuals to fellow EU states.

The Croatian Parliament passed an amendment to Croatia's extradition law just days before formal EU accession, including a provision which prevented extradition for crimes committed before 2002, when new EU extradition rules came into effect, thus omitting the 1983 murder of Đureković in which Perković was implicated. This amendment was highly controversial in Croatia; the government's critics dubbed the law Lex Perković, asserting it was changed specifically to protect him.

The abrupt passing of the amendment imposing time limit on European Arrest Warrants caused a diplomatic dispute with Germany, with the Croatian government saying at the time it wanted to protect war veterans of the 1991–95 Croatian War of Independence from facing potential arrests and prosecution elsewhere in the EU. The situation negatively impacted Croatian–German relations temporarily. Chairman of the Committee for European Issues of the German Bundestag, Gunther Krichbaum, expressed discontent, stating this was a political move by the Croatian government with the intent of making an ad hoc law exclusively protecting Perković from extradition.

The government later lifted the time restriction in August 2014, only after the European Commission warned that the amended law was in violation of Croatia's EU accession treaty and that it could face legal action, including the loss of EU development funds. Perković was arrested in Zagreb on 1 January 2014 and extradited to Germany on 24 January.

Another former intelligence chief, Zdravko Mustač, was also extradited to Germany over alleged involvement in the Đureković murder, and the trial for both of them started at a Munich court on 17 October 2014. They both denied the charges.

In August 2016, Perković and Mustač were both sentenced to life in prison for abetting the murder of Đureković in a first-instance verdict. Responsibility for Perković was later transferred to Croatia. In 2018, the Croatian government reduced his sentence to 30 years. In 2019, Perković was transferred to a Croatian prison to serve out the remainder of his sentence.
