= Mišeluk =

Neighborhood of Novi Sad, Serbia

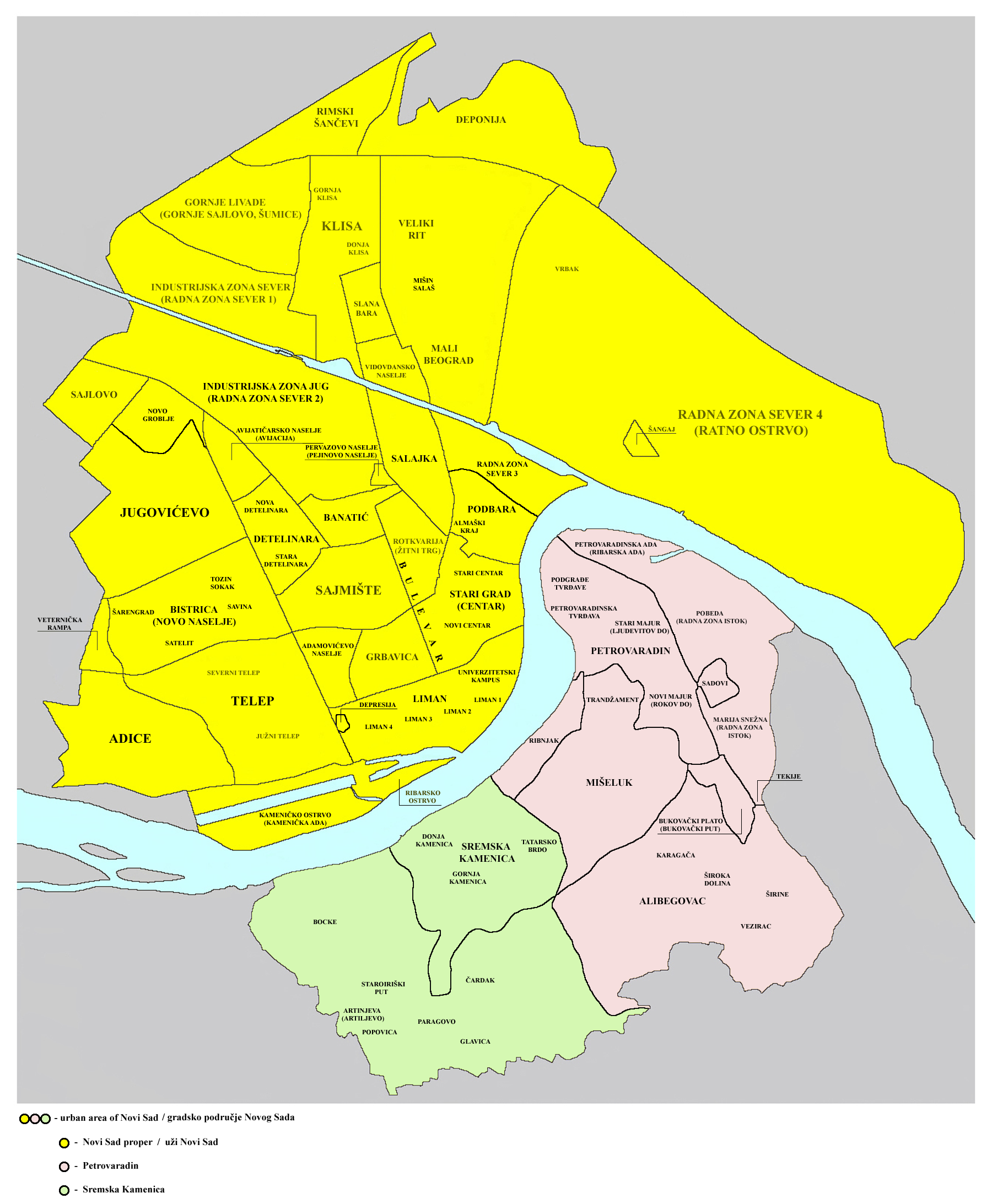
Map of the urban area of Novi Sad with city quarters, showing the location of Mišeluk

Mišeluk (Serbian: Мишелук) is a neighborhood of the city of Novi Sad in Serbia.

== Geography ==
Mišeluk is located in Syrmian part of Novi Sad, between Petrovaradin and Sremska Kamenica. Administratively, Mišeluk is regarded as part of Petrovaradin. It is divided into 3 parts: Mišeluk 1, Mišeluk 2, and Mišeluk 3.

== History ==
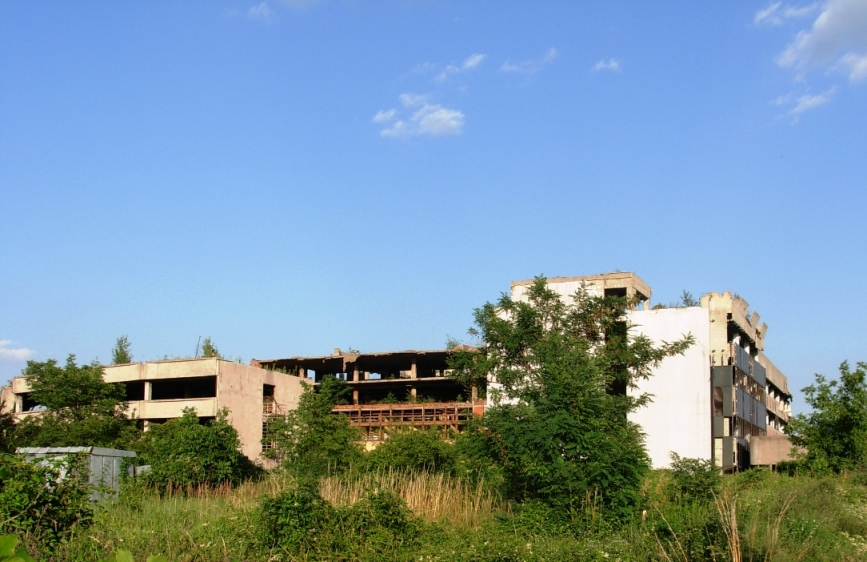
Razed building of TV NS

During NATO bombing of Novi Sad in 1999, buildings of the Radio Television Novi Sad in Mišeluk were devastated by NATO bombs.

== Population ==
Currently, Mišeluk neighborhood is sparsely inhabited, but city authorities are currently planning for Mišeluk to become a central neighborhood in the Syrmian part of Novi Sad. With planned 40,000 future residents, it will be larger than Petrovaradin and Sremska Kamenica.

== Events ==
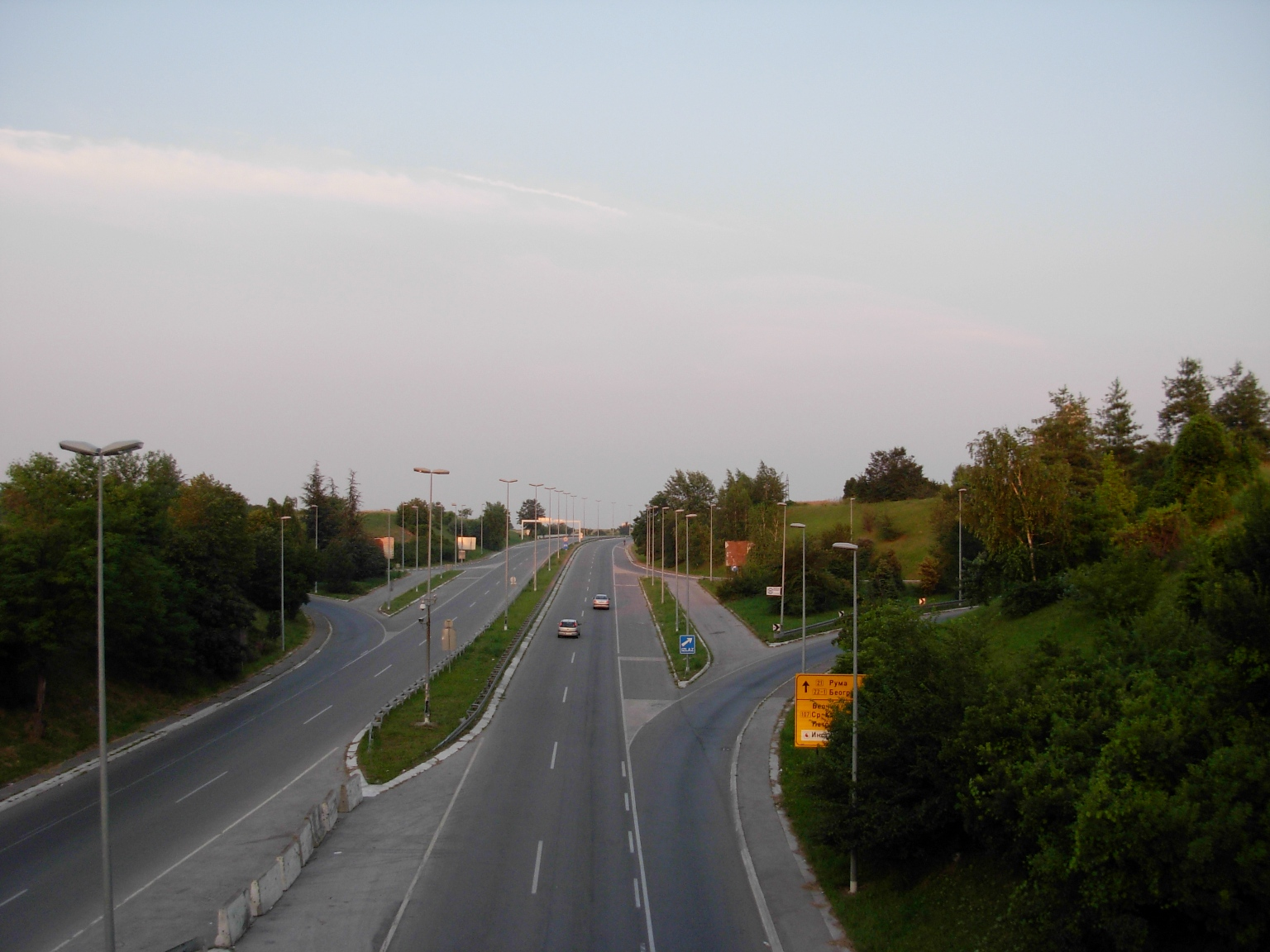
Mišeluk

Mišeluk is the site of largest annual auto-moto racing championship in Serbia (and formerly in Yugoslavia).

== See also ==
- Neighborhoods of Novi Sad
