= Petrovaradin =

Petrovaradin Петроварадин (Serbian)
- Town
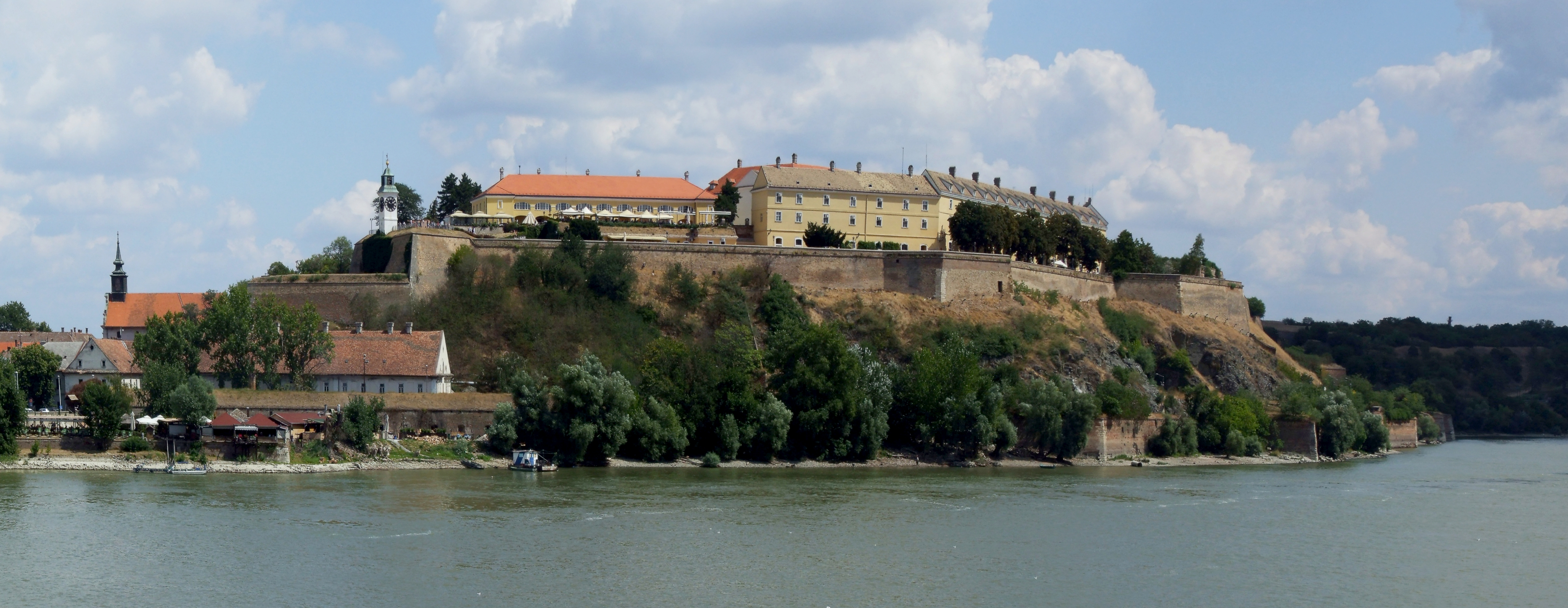
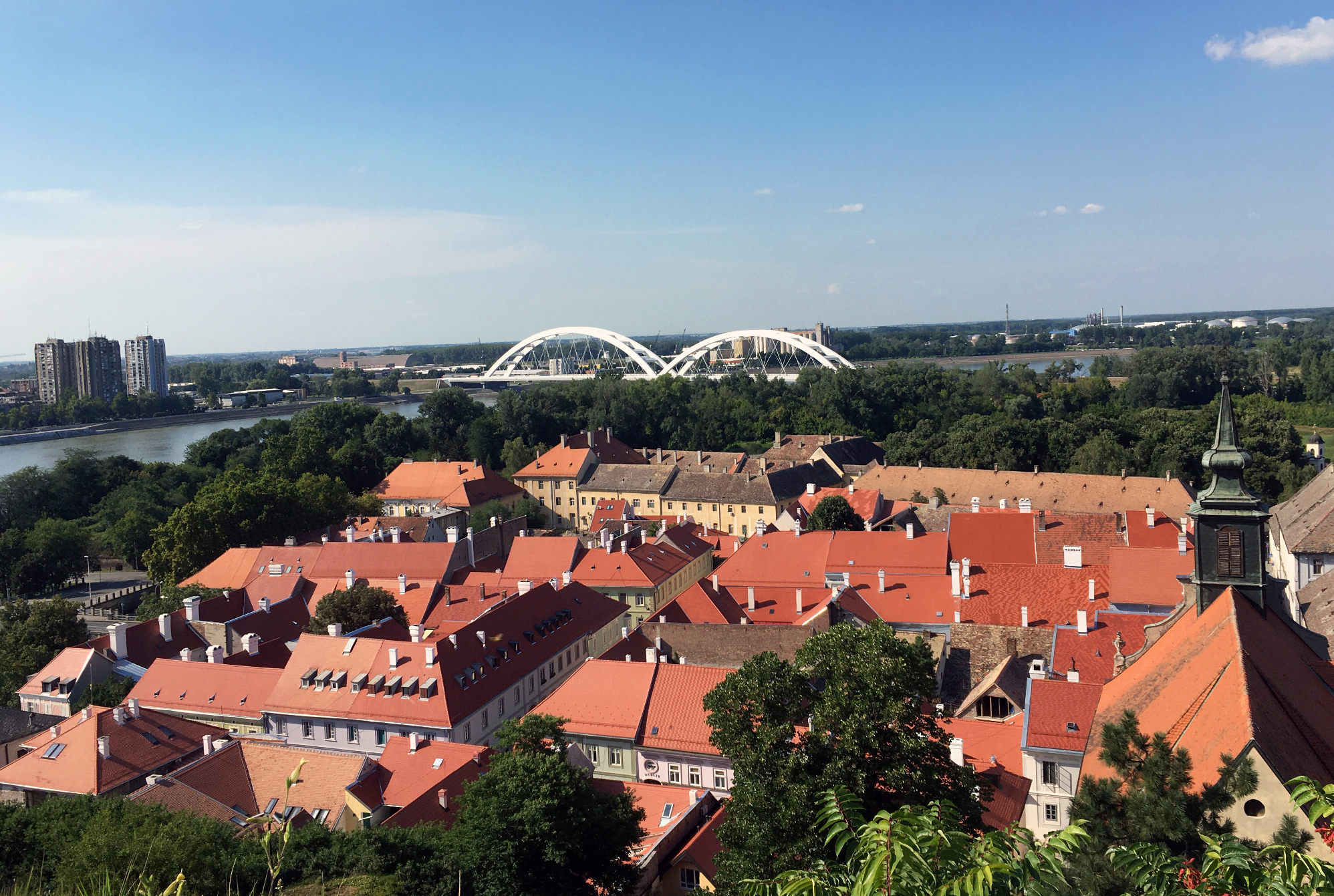
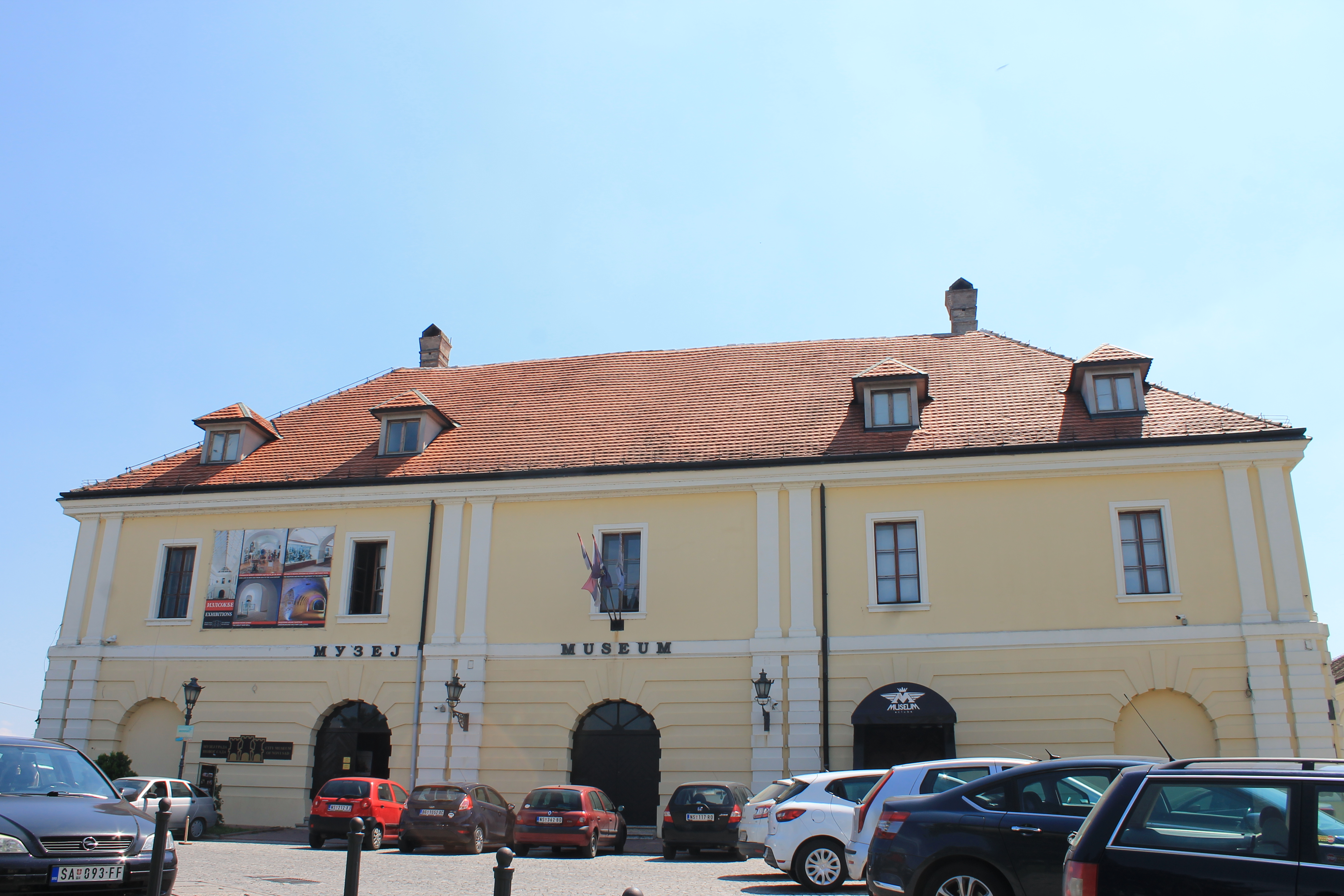
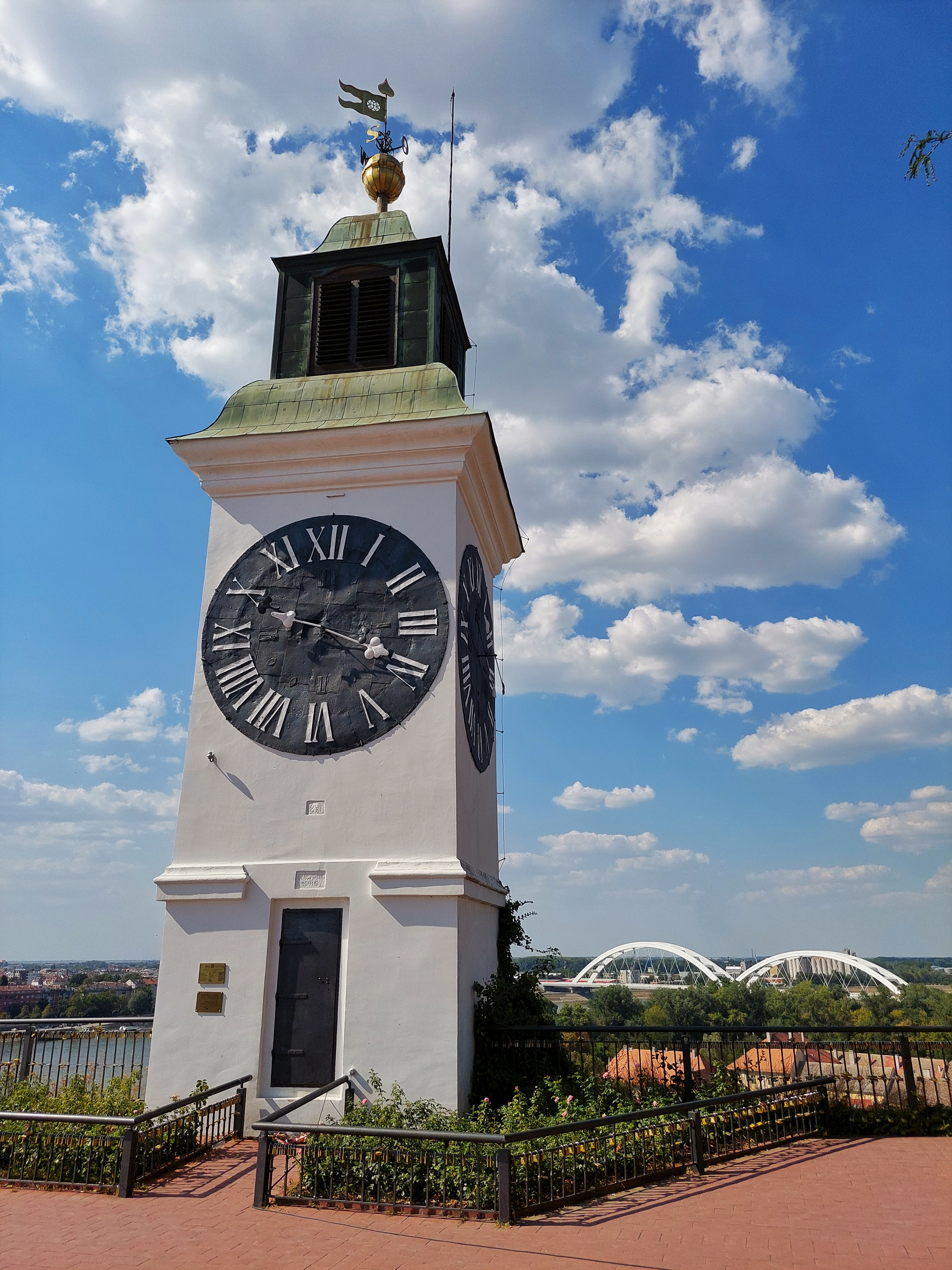
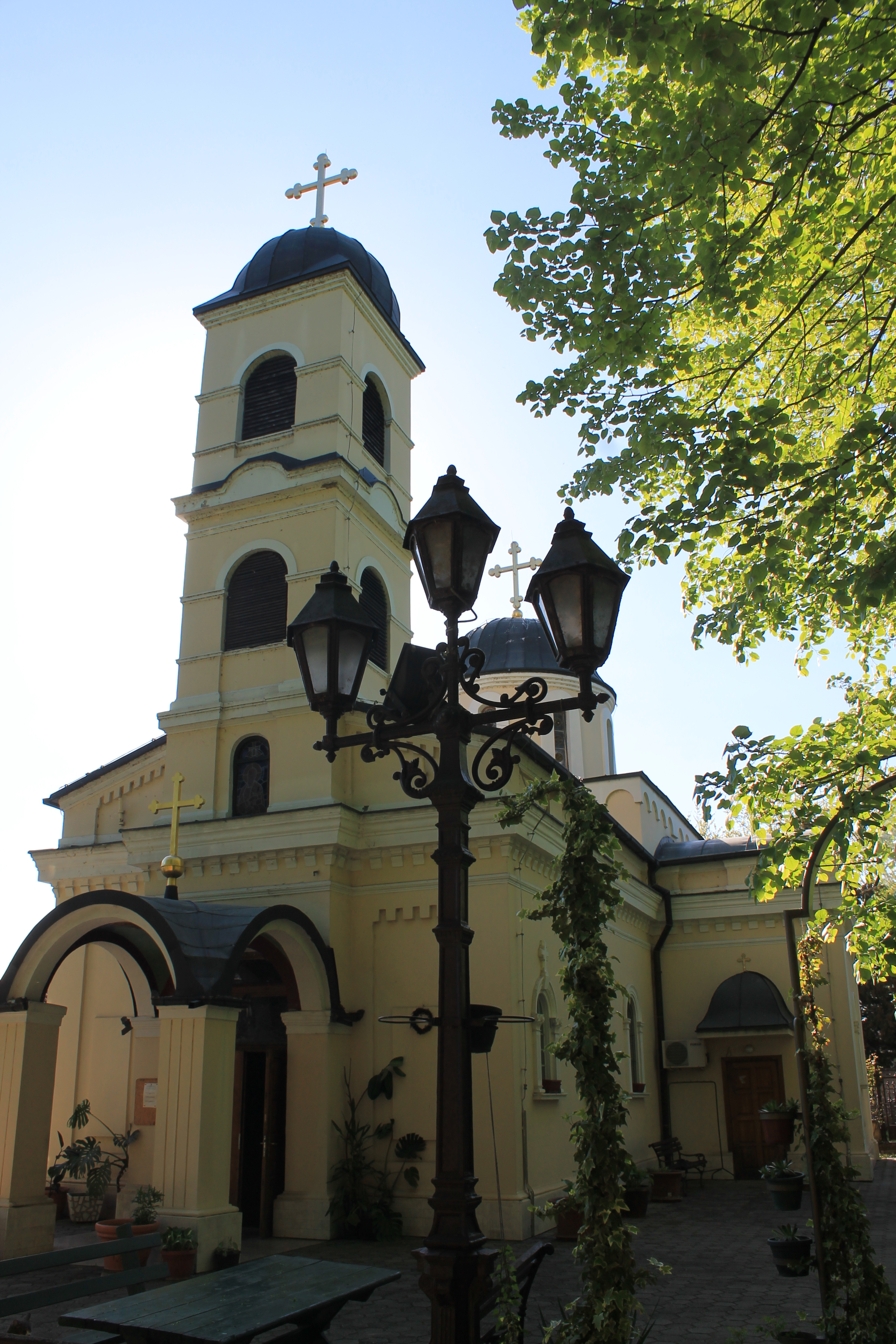
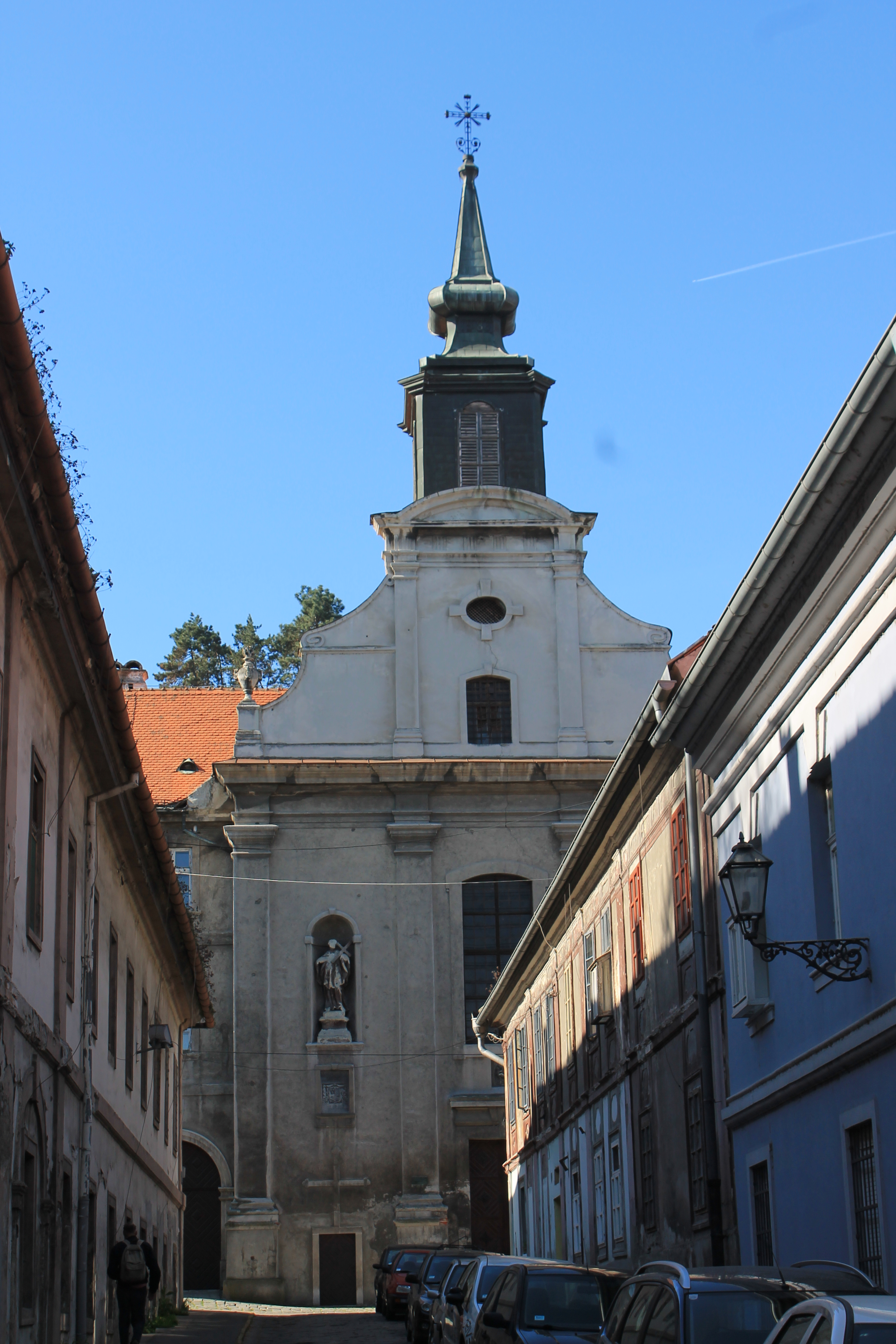
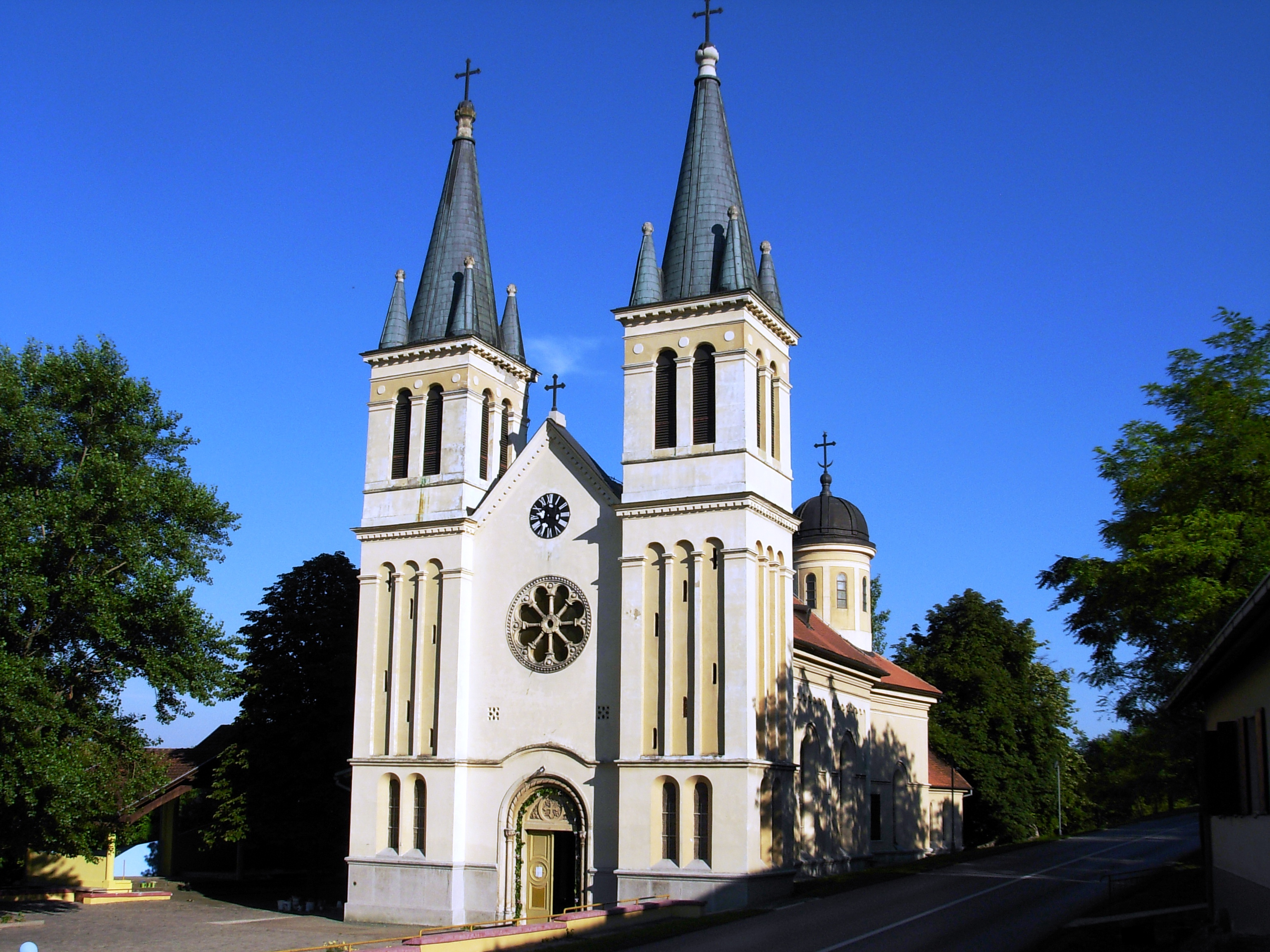
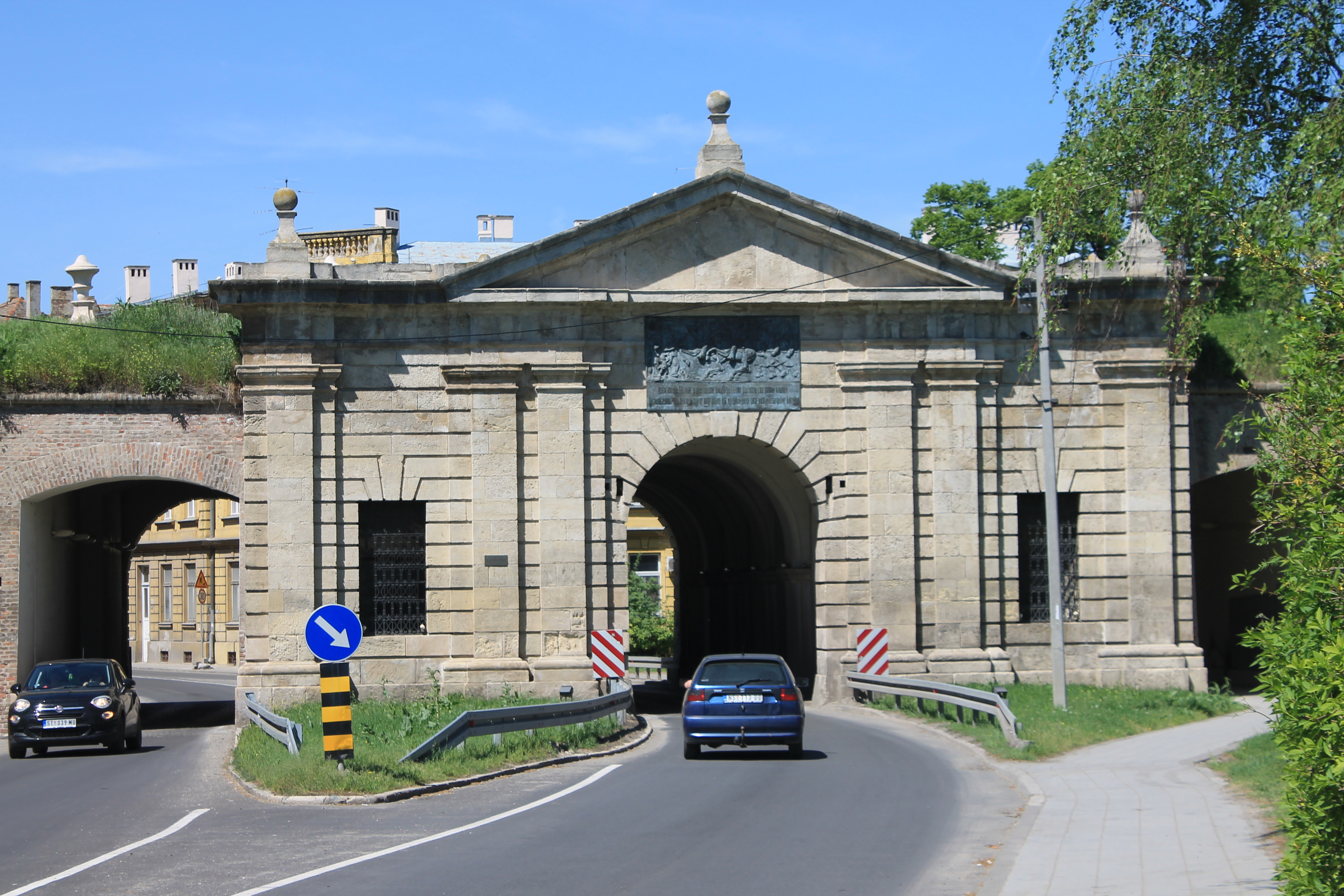
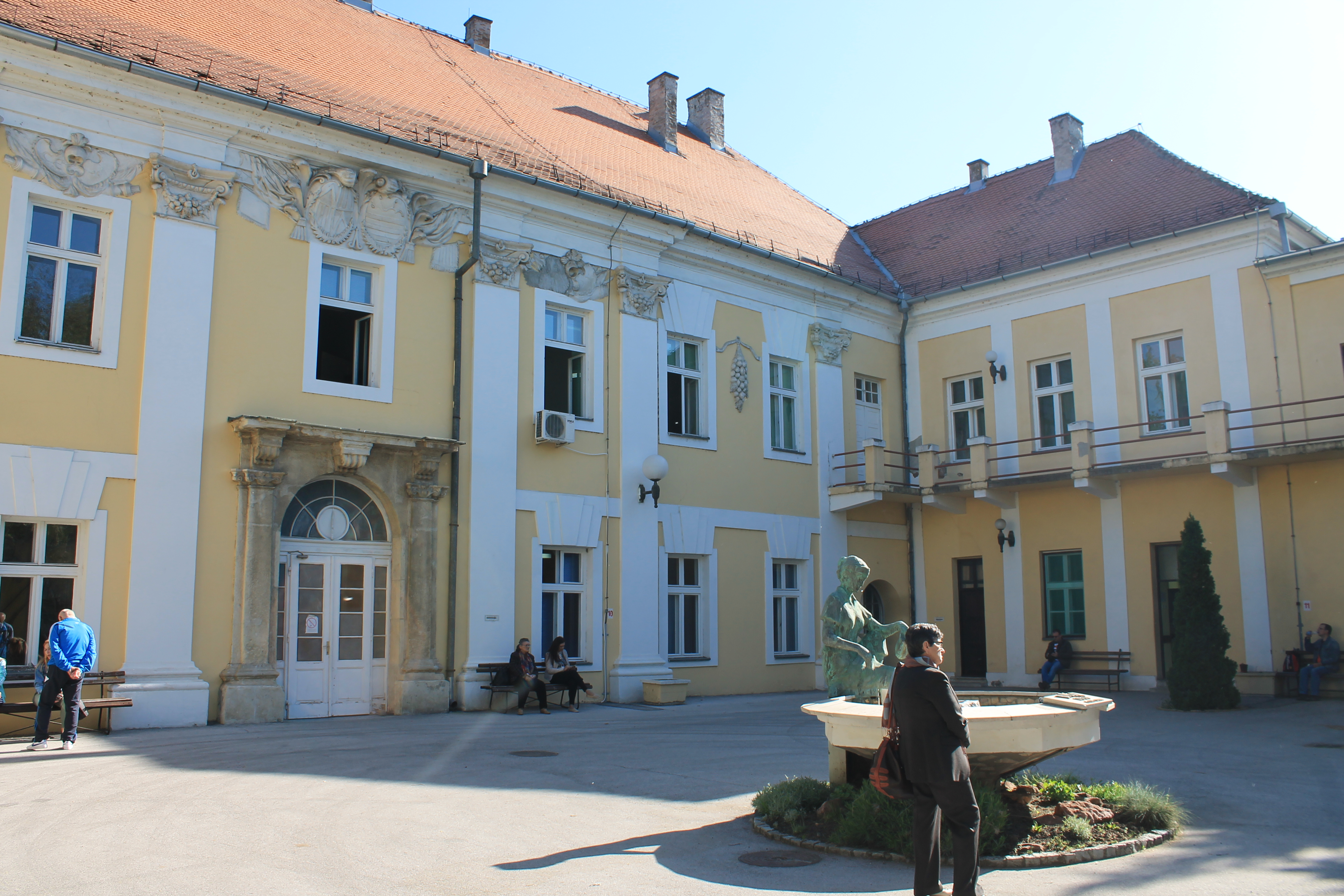
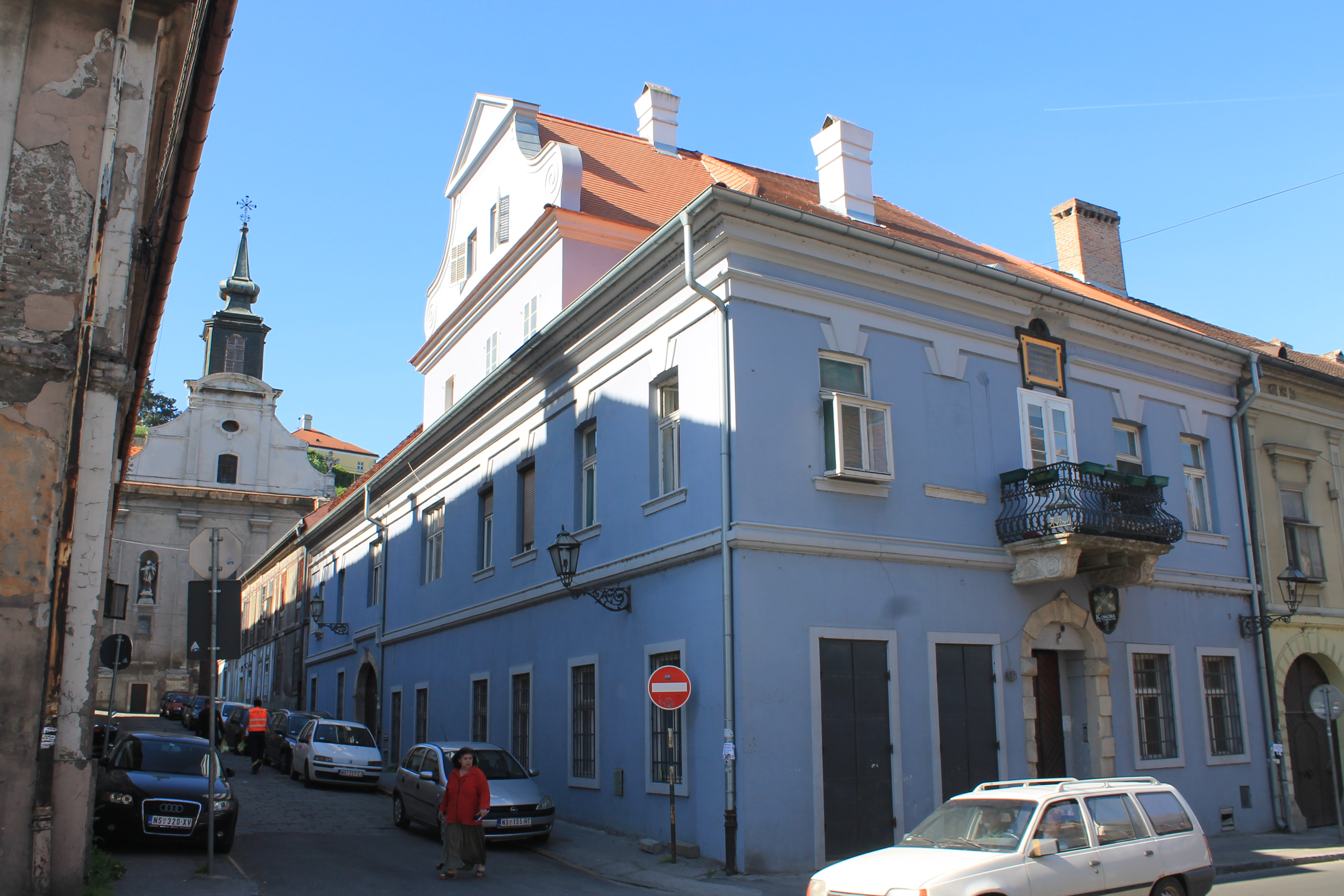
- Petrovaradin Fortress Petrovaradin's Podgrađe City Museum of Novi Sad Petrovaradin Clock Tower Church of St. Paul Church of St. George Our Lady of Snow Ecumenic Church Belgrade Gate Military Hospital Josip Jelačić's Birth House

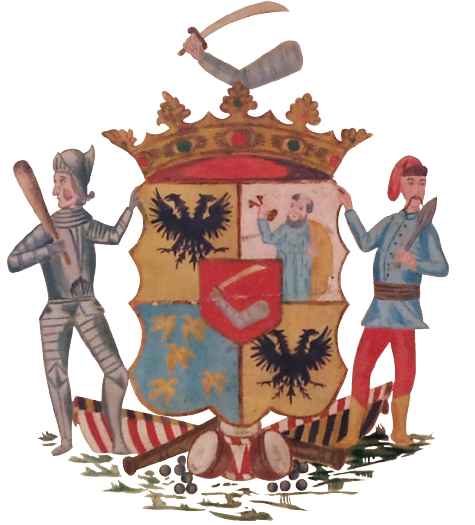
- Coat of arms
- Interactive map of Petrovaradin
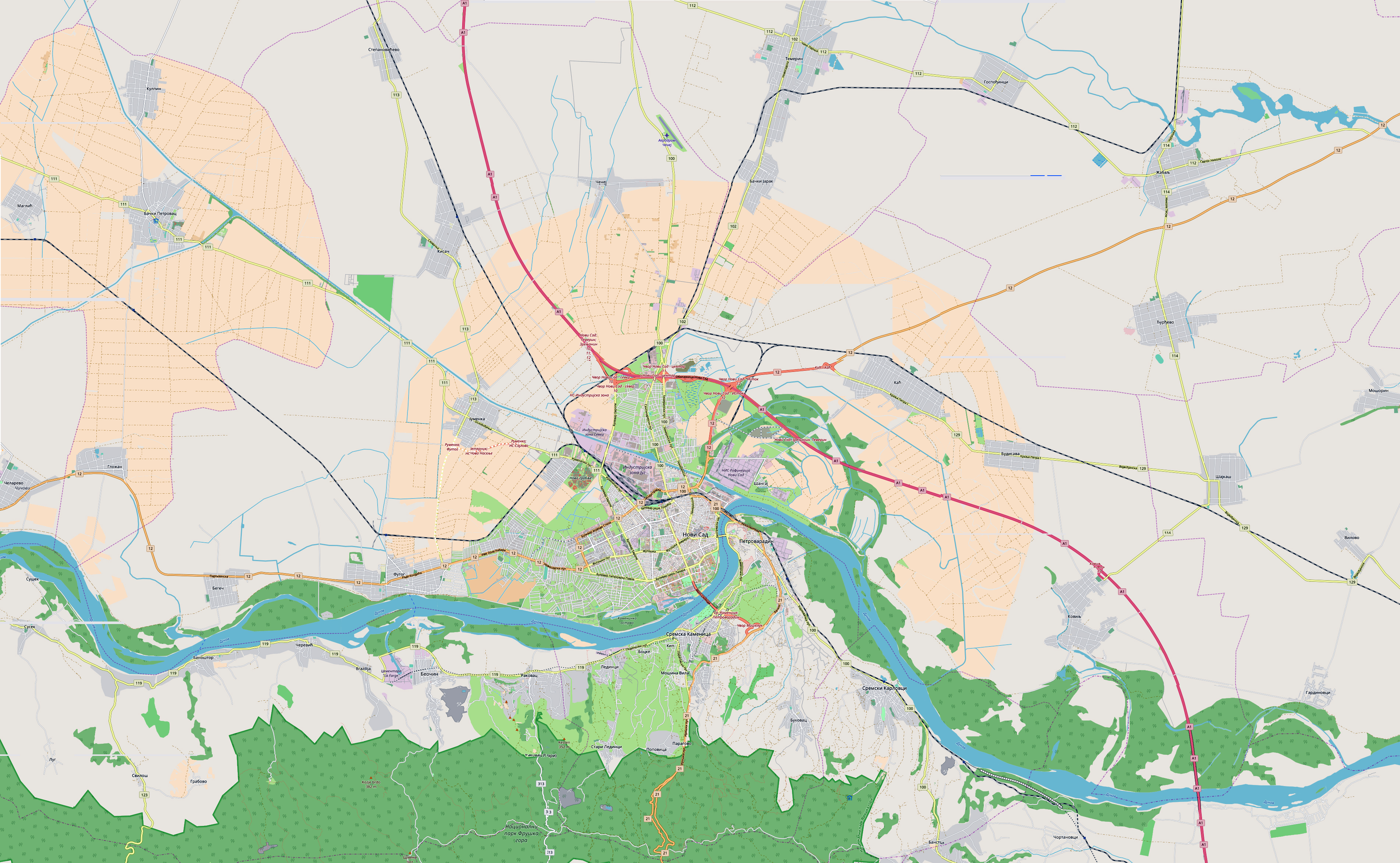
- Location within Novi Sad
- Coordinates: 45°15′N 19°52′E
- Country: Serbia
- Province: Vojvodina
- District: South Bačka
- City: Novi Sad

Area
  - Urban: 56.40 km^{2} (21.78 sq mi)
- Elevation: 81 m (266 ft)

Population
  - Urban: 14,810
  - Municipality: 33,865
- Time zone: UTC+1 (CET)
  - Summer (DST): UTC+2 (CEST)
- Postal code: 21131
- Area code: +381 21
- Vehicle registration: ns

Petrovaradin (Serbian Cyrillic: Петроварадин, pronounced [petroʋarǎdiːn]) is a historic town in the Serbian Autonomous Province of Vojvodina, now a part of the city of Novi Sad. As of 2022, the urban area has 15,621 inhabitants. Lying on the right bank of the Danube, across the main part of Novi Sad, it is built around the Petrovaradin Fortress, the historical anchor of the modern city.

== Name ==
Petrovaradin was founded by the Celts, but its original name is unknown. During Roman administration it was known as Cusum. After the Romans conquered the region from the Celtic tribe of Scordisci, they built the Cusum fortress where present Petrovaradin Fortress now stands. In addition, the town received its name from the Byzantines, who called it Petrikon or Petrikov (Πετρικον) and who presumably named it after Saint Peter.

In documents from 1237, the town was first mentioned under the name Peturwarod (Pétervárad), which was named after Hungarian lord Peter, son of Töre. Petrovaradin was known under the name Pétervárad during Hungarian administration, Varadin or Petervaradin during Ottoman administration, and Peterwardein during Habsburg administration.

Today, the municipality is known in Serbian as Петроварадин, in Hungarian as Pétervárad, and in German as Peterwardein.

== Geography ==
Petrovaradin is located in the Syrmia region, on the Danube river and Fruška Gora, a horst mountain with elevation of 78–220 m (municipality up to 451 m). The northern part of Fruška Gora consists of massive landslide zones, but they are not active, except in Ribnjak neighborhood (between Sremska Kamenica and Petrovaradin fortress).

== History ==
Human settlement in the territory of present-day Petrovaradin has been traced as far back as the Stone Age (about 4500 BC). This region was conquered by Celts (in the 4th century BC) and Romans (in the 1st century BC).

The Celts founded the first fortress at this location. It was part of the tribal state of the Scordisci, which had its capital in Singidunum (present-day Belgrade). During the Roman administration, a larger fortress was built (in the 1st century) with the name Cusum and was included into Roman Pannonia. Subsequently, the fortress was included into the Pannonia Inferior and the Pannonia Secunda. In the 5th century, Cusum was devastated by the invasion of the Huns.

The town was then conquered by Ostrogoths, Gepids, and Lombards. By the end of the 5th century, Byzantines had reconstructed the town and called it by the names Cusum and Petrikon or Petrikov. It was part of the Byzantine province of Pannonia. Subsequently, it passed into the hands of Avars, Franks, Bulgarians and Byzantines again. During Bulgarian administration, the town was known as Petrik and was part of the domain of duke Sermon, while during subsequent Byzantine administration, it was part of the Theme of Sirmium.

Later, the town became part of the Kingdom of Hungary.

Between 1522 and 1526, Petrovaradin was a base for the early Ŝajkaš regiments, but in 1526, the Ottoman Empire took Petrovaradin after a two-week battle waged against the combined forces of Croats, Serbs and Hungarians.

In the war of 1683–1699 with the Habsburg monarchy, the Ottomans abandoned Petrovaradin. In 1690, they returned for just two years. After that, Petrovaradin remained under Habsburg control as a part of the Slavonian Military Frontier.

In 1695, a military force of Serbs—600 infantry and 200 cavalry—under Captain Pane Božić were brought to Petrovaradin to serve. One thousand Serbs worked on the construction of the Citadel and fortifications under the guidance of military engineer Sébastien Le Prestre de Vauban.

During Hungarian administration, the town was firstly part of the Bolgyán County and then part of the Syrmia County, while during Ottoman administration, it was firstly part of the vassal duchy of Syrmia ruled by Serb duke Radoslav Čelnik (1527–1530), and then part of the Sanjak of Syrmia.

During the Ottoman administration, Petrovaradin had 200 houses and three mosques. There was also a Christian quarter with 35 houses populated with Croats.

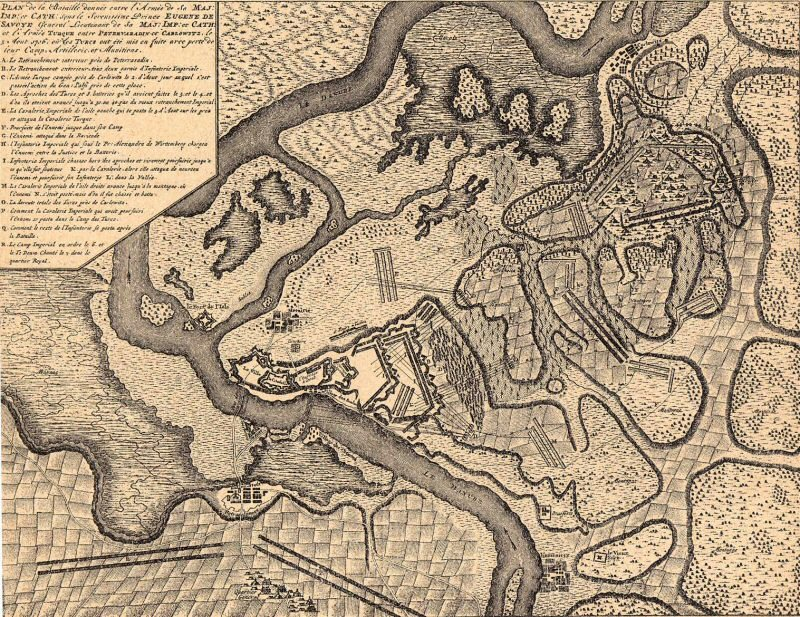
Battle of Petrovaradin 1716.

Petrovaradin was the site of a notable battle on August 5, 1716 in which the Habsburg monarchy led by the Prince Eugene of Savoy defeated the forces of the Ottomans led by the Silahdar Damat Ali Pasha. Habsburg forces led by Prince Eugene later defeated the Ottomans at Belgrade before the Ottomans sued for peace at Požarevac.

During the Habsburg administration, Petrovaradin was part of the Habsburg Military Frontier (Slavonian general command - Petrovaradin regiment). In 1848–49, the town was part of Serbian Vojvodina, but in 1849, it was returned under the administration of the Military Frontier. With the abolishment of the Military Frontier in 1881, the town was included into the Syrmia County of Croatia-Slavonia, which was the autonomous kingdom within Austria-Hungary.

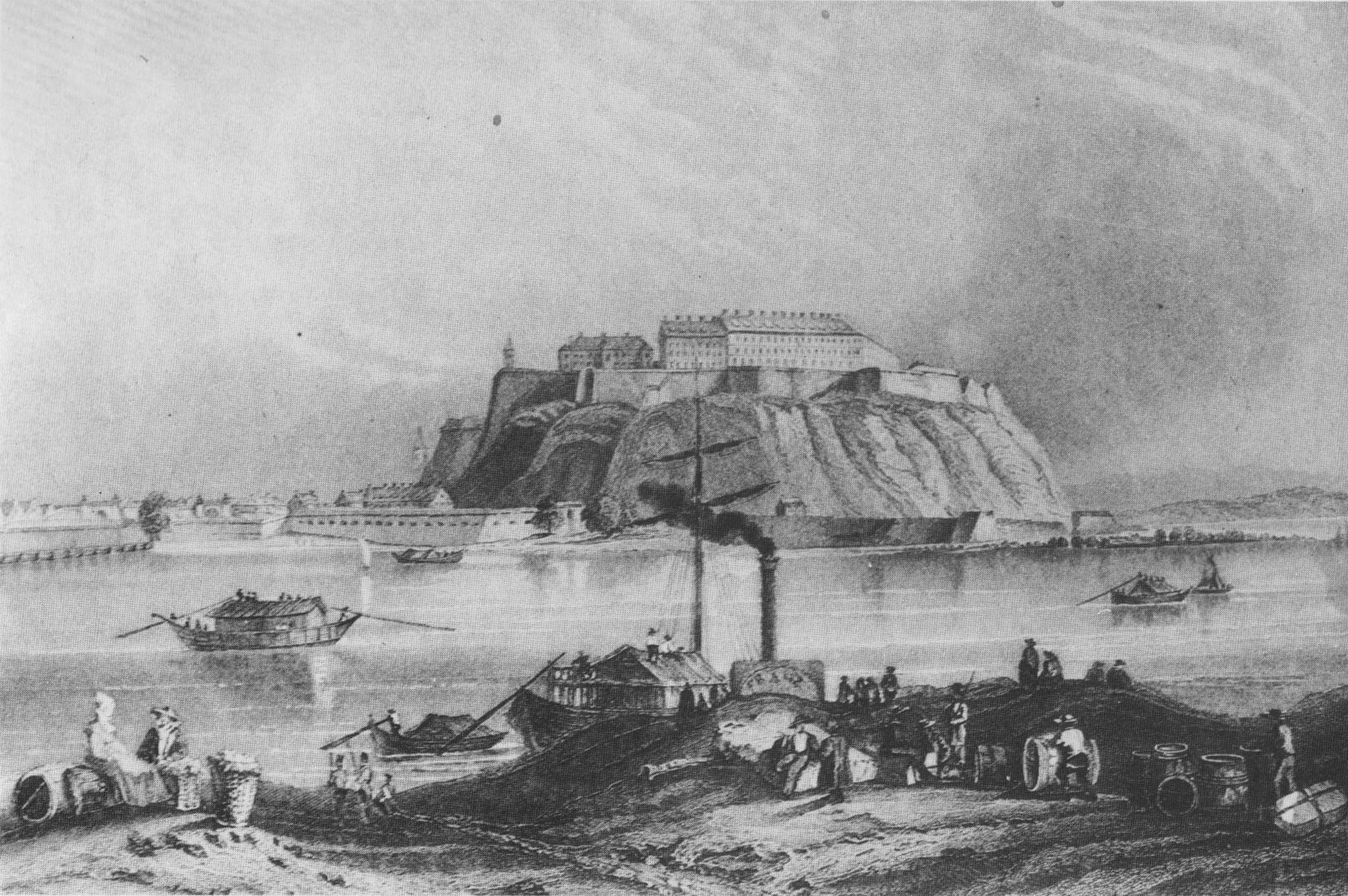
Petrovaradin fortress 1830.

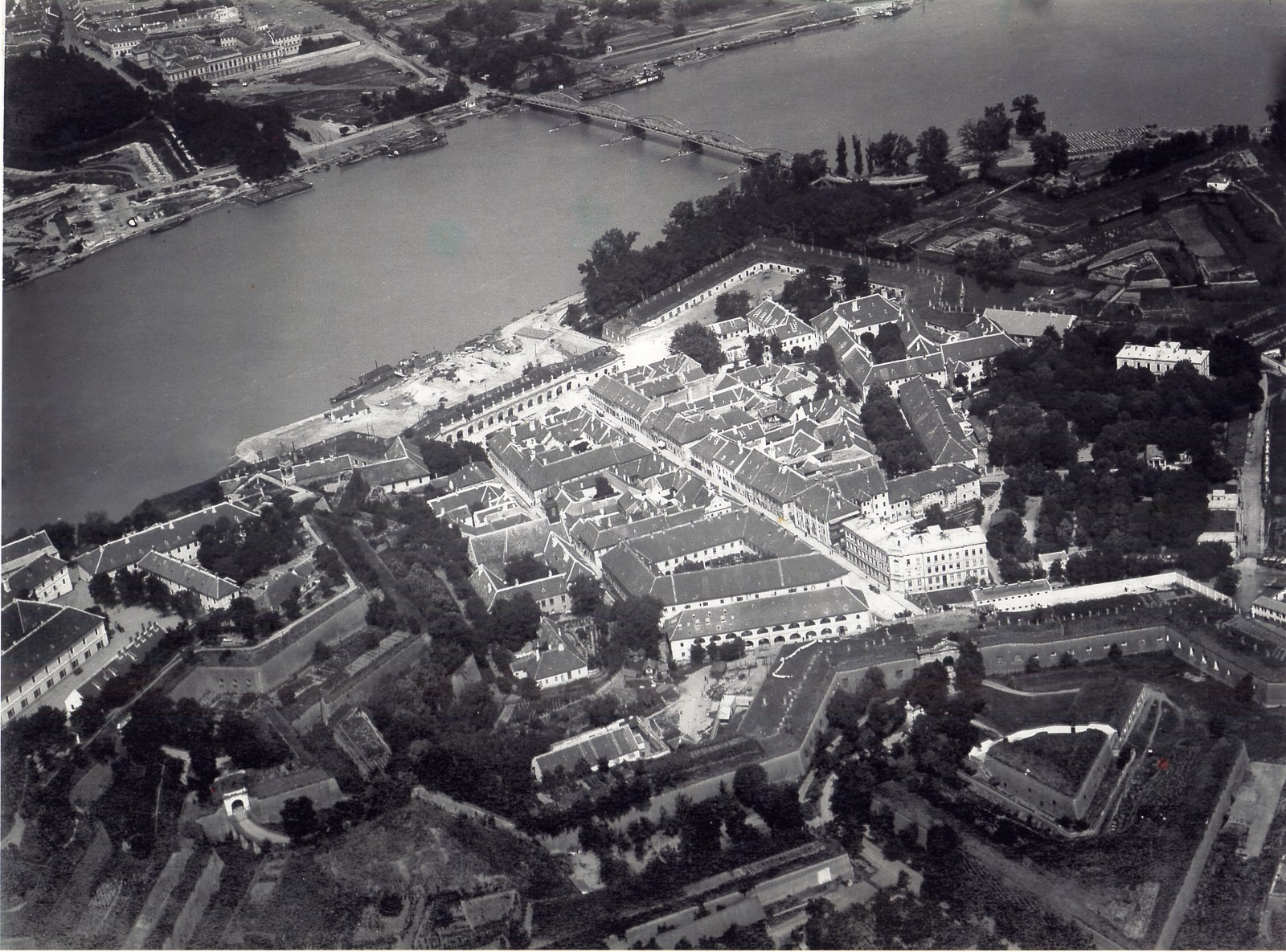
Petrovaradin Podgrađe, 1920s.

In 1918, the town firstly became part of the State of Slovenes, Croats and Serbs, then part of the Kingdom of Serbia and finally part of the Kingdom of Serbs, Croats and Slovenes (later known as Yugoslavia). Between 1918 and 1922, the town was part of the Syrmia County, between 1922 and 1929 part of the Syrmia Oblast, and between 1929 and 1941 part of the Danube Banovina, a province of the Kingdom of Yugoslavia. From 1918 to 1936, Yugoslav Royal Air Force was based in Petrovaradin. During World War II (1941–1944), the town was occupied by the Axis Powers and it was attached to the Independent State of Croatia. Since the end of the war in this part of Yugoslavia in 1944, the town was part of the Autonomous Province of Vojvodina, which from 1945 was part of the new socialist Serbia within socialist Yugoslavia.

== Settlements and neighborhoods ==
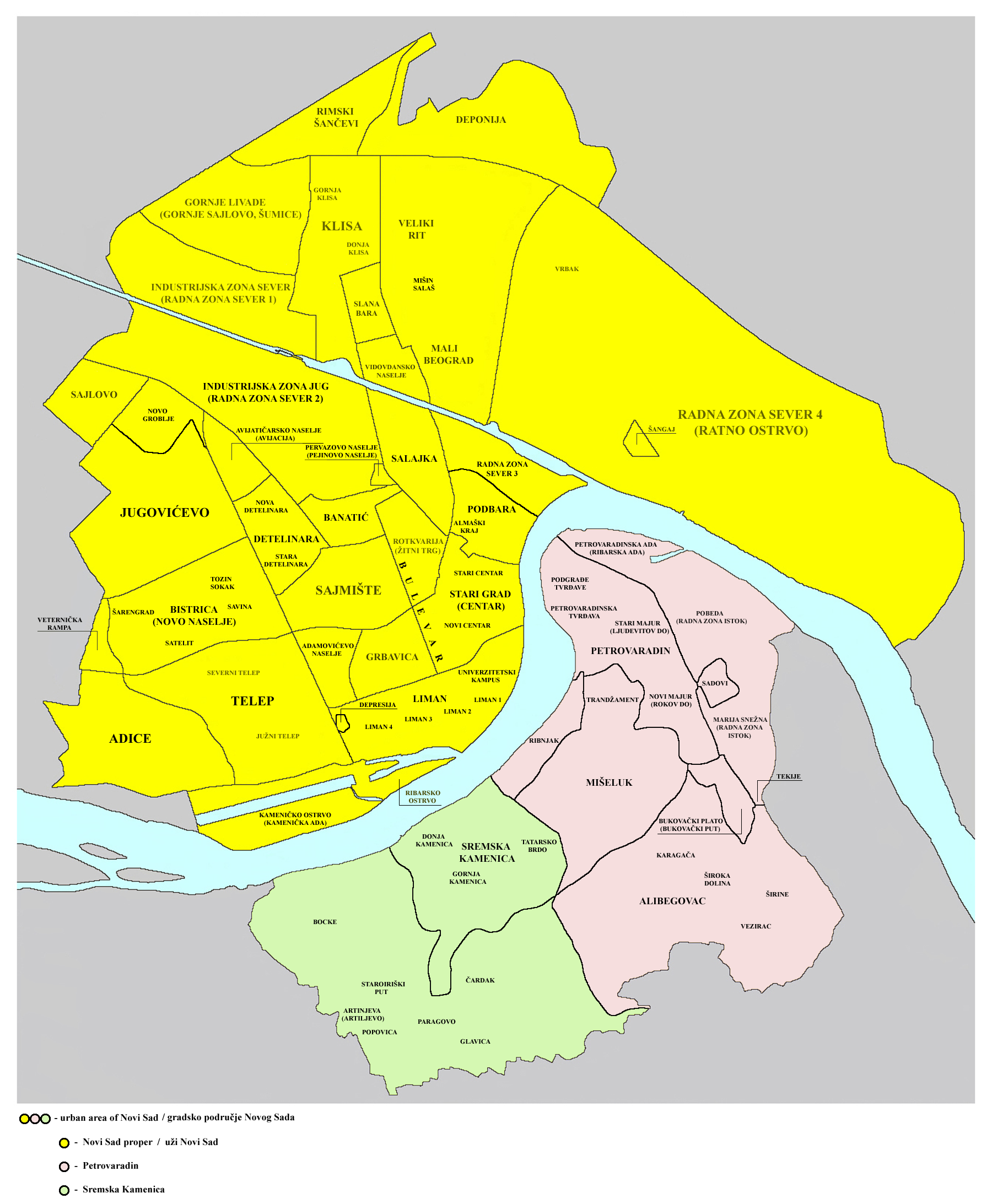
Map of the urban area of Novi Sad with city neighborhoods, showing the location of Petrovaradin in light red

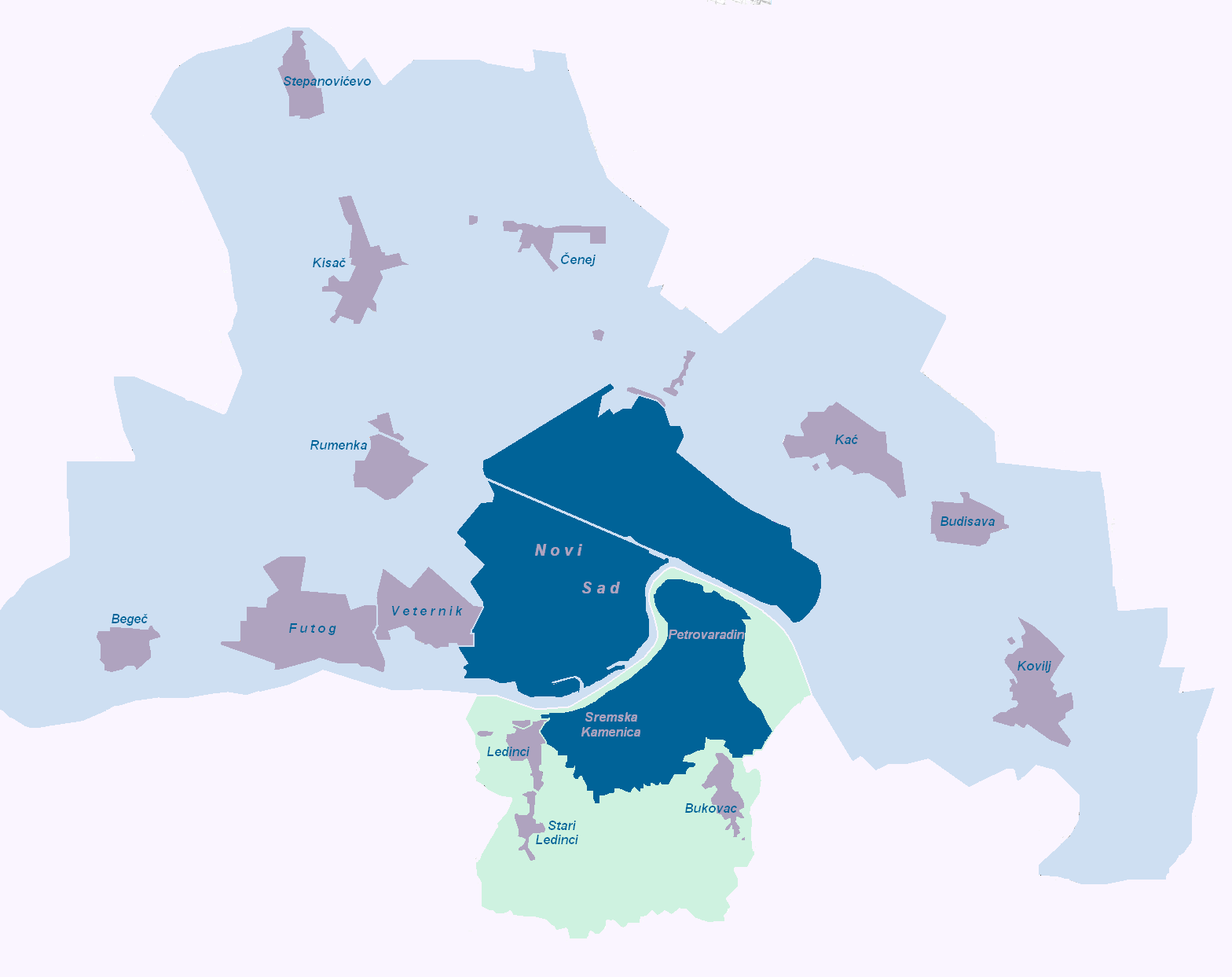
City of Novi Sad: City Municipality of Petrovaradin City Municipality of Novi Sad

Neighborhoods and parts of Petrovaradin are: Petrovaradin Fortress, Podgrađe Tvrđave (which is a fortified part of Petrovaradin and part of Petrovaradin Fortress complex), Stari Majur (which is part of Petrovaradin where offices of Petrovaradin local community are located), Novi Majur, Bukovački Plato (Bukovački Put), Sadovi, Široka Dolina, Širine, Vezirac, Trandžament, Ribnjak, Mišeluk, Alibegovac, Radna Zona Istok, Marija Snežna (Radna Zona Istok), and Petrovaradinska Ada (Ribarska Ada).

Between 2002 and 2019, Petrovaradin had a status of separate municipality within the city of Novi Sad, but its administrative bodies were never established and the status was mostly formal. Apart from the town, the municipality covered the area on the right Danube bank: town of Sremska Kamenica; and villages of Stari Ledinci, Novi Ledinci and Bukovac, with some 34,000 residents in total. The municipality status was terminated by a City Assembly decision in 2019.

== Demographics ==
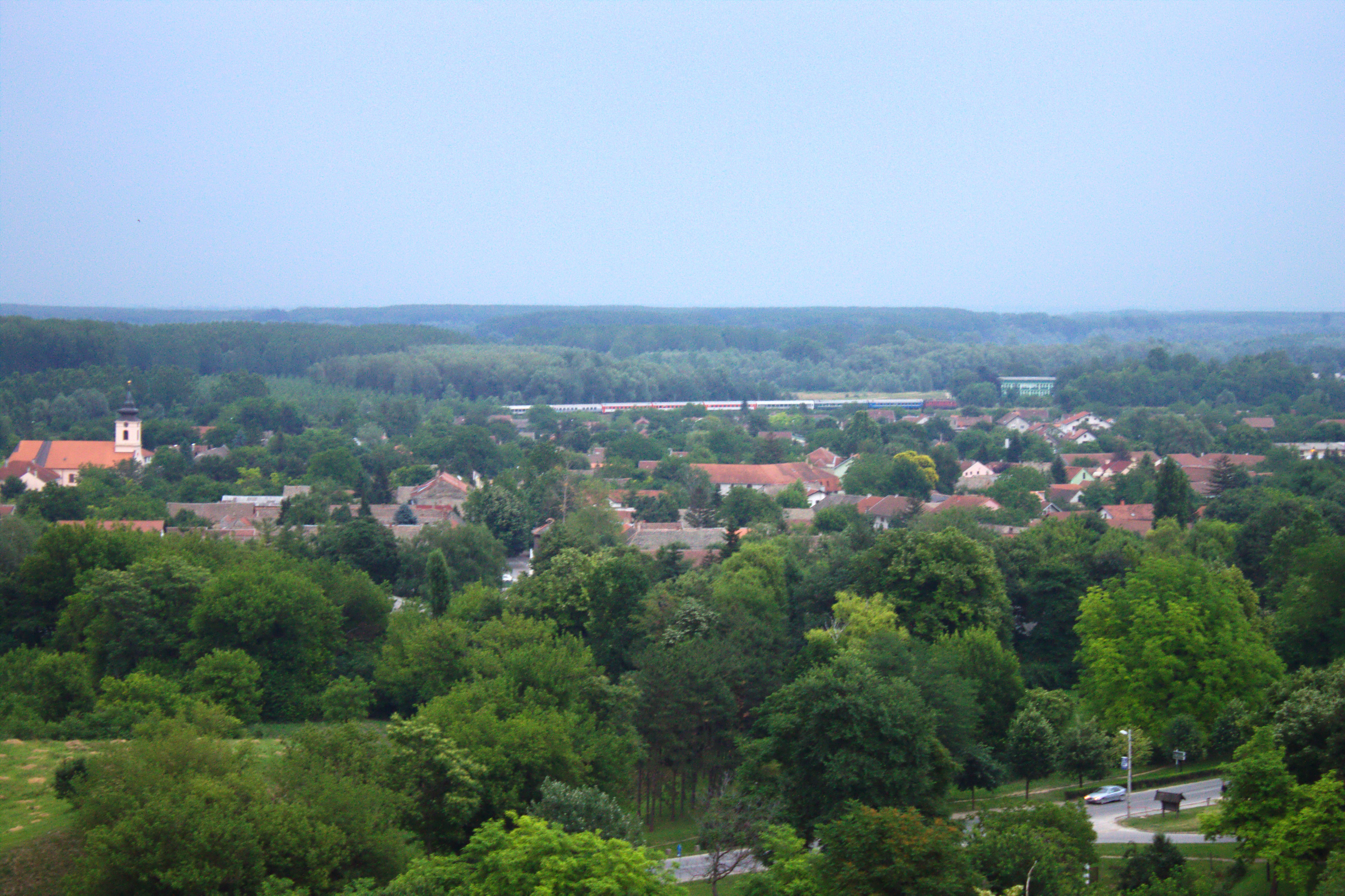
Stari Majur neighborhood

In 1961 Petrovaradin had 8,408 inhabitants; in 1971 10,477; in 1981 10,338; in 1991 11,285; and in 2002 13,973. By city's registry estimation, from mid-2005, Petrovaradin town had 15,266 inhabitants.

=== Ethnic groups ===
Municipality

According to the 2011 census, the total population of the territory of present-day Petrovaradin municipality was 33,865, of whom 27,328 (80.69%) were ethnic Serbs. All settlements in the municipality have an ethnic Serb majority.

Town

Ethnic group	1991	%	2002	%
Serbs	5,643	50%	9,708	69.48%
Croats	2,236	19.81%	1,364	9.76%
Yugoslavs	1,893	16.78%	779	5.58%
Hungarians	431	3.82%	396	2.83%
Montenegrins	250	2.22%	228	1.63%
Ruthenians	148	1.31%	141	1.01%
Other	653	5.79%	1,357	9.71%
Total	11,285	-	13,973	-

During the Ottoman administration, Petrovaradin was mostly populated by Muslims, while some Serbs lived there as well in the Christian quarter. According to Habsburg census from 1720, inhabitants of Petrovaradin mostly had German and Serbo-Croatian names and surnames. During the subsequent period of the Habsburg administration and in the first part of the 20th century, the largest ethnic group in the Petrovaradin town were ethnic Croats. According to the 1910 census the town had 5,527 residents, of which 3,266 spoke Croatian (59.09%), 894 German (16.18%), 730 Serbian (13.21%), 521 Hungarian (9.43%) and 159 Slovak (2.88%). Since 1971 census, largest ethnic group in Petrovaradin are Serbs. Today, there are a couple of neighborhoods with sizable number of Croats in Petrovaradin, like Stari Majur and Podgrađe Tvrđave.

== Economy ==
The following table gives a preview of total number of employed people per their core activity (as of 2017):

Activity	Total
Agriculture, forestry and fishing	163
Mining	12
Processing industry	1,081
Distribution of power, gas and water	114
Distribution of water and water waste management	610
Construction	373
Wholesale and retail, repair	1,206
Traffic, storage and communication	333
Hotels and restaurants	198
Media and telecommunications	115
Finance and insurance	15
Property stock and charter	3
Professional, scientific, innovative and technical activities	280
Administrative and other services	86
Administration and social assurance	174
Education	384
Healthcare and social work	2,252
Art, leisure and recreation	181
Other services	117
Total	7,687

== Politics ==
Between 1980 and 1989, Petrovaradin was a municipality within the city of Novi Sad. From 1989 to 2002, Novi Sad's municipalities were abolished and territory of the former Petrovaradin municipality was part of Novi Sad municipality, which included the whole territory of the present-day City of Novi Sad. The city municipalities of Novi Sad were formally re-established in 2002, with Petrovaradin as the second one, since it was a requirement to obtain a city status at the time. In 2007, after the update of the law of local government, the requirement for multiple municipalities for city status was lifted (and 20 additional cities were proclaimed). However, the renewed 2008 city statute also foresaw formation of two separate municipalities, but they have never been established, and the whole city was run solely by the city administration. Petrovaradin only has a local community office. In March 2019, a new city statute was adopted, abolishing any separate municipalities.

== Gallery ==
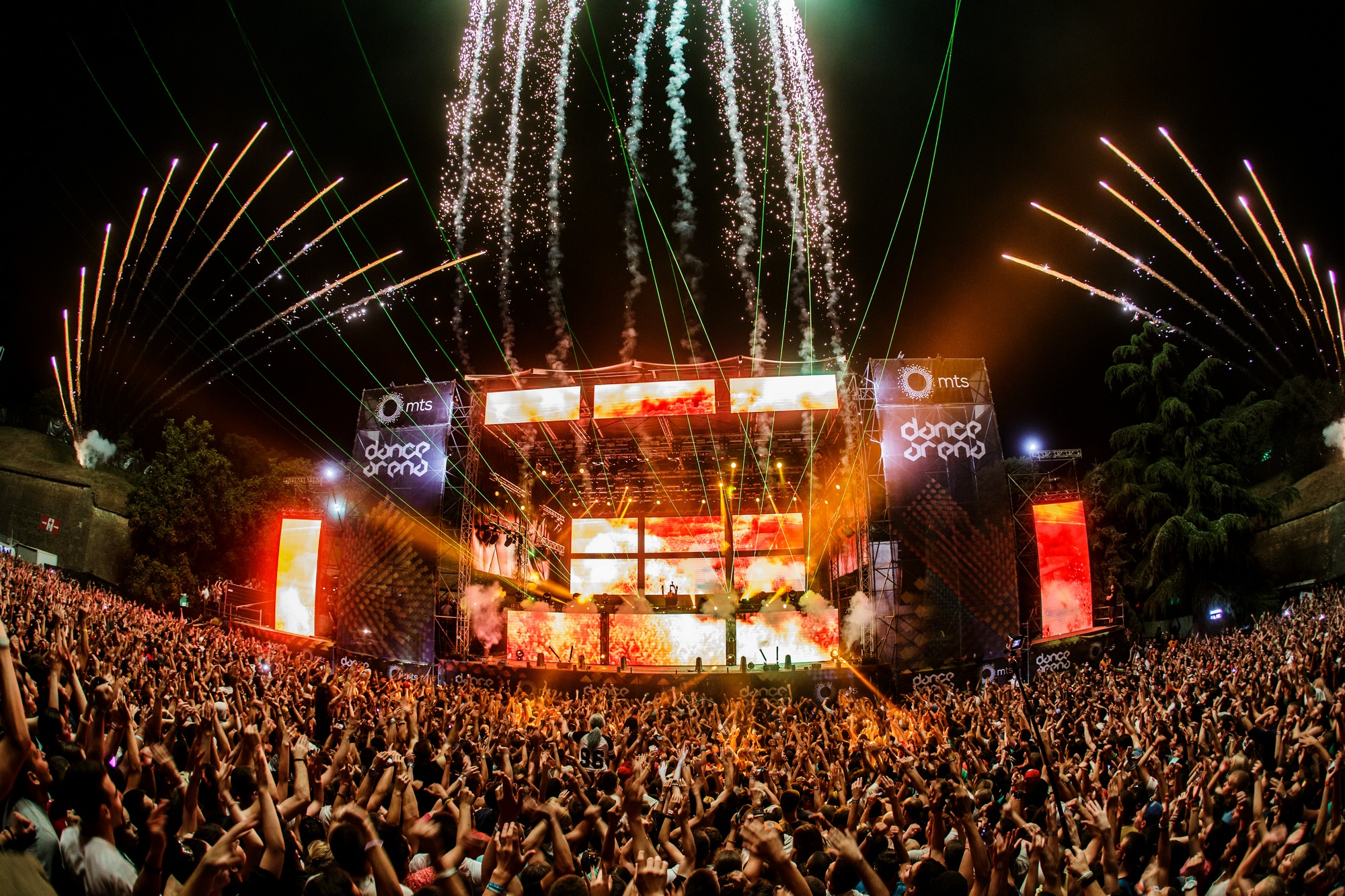
Petrovaradin fortress during EXIT festival

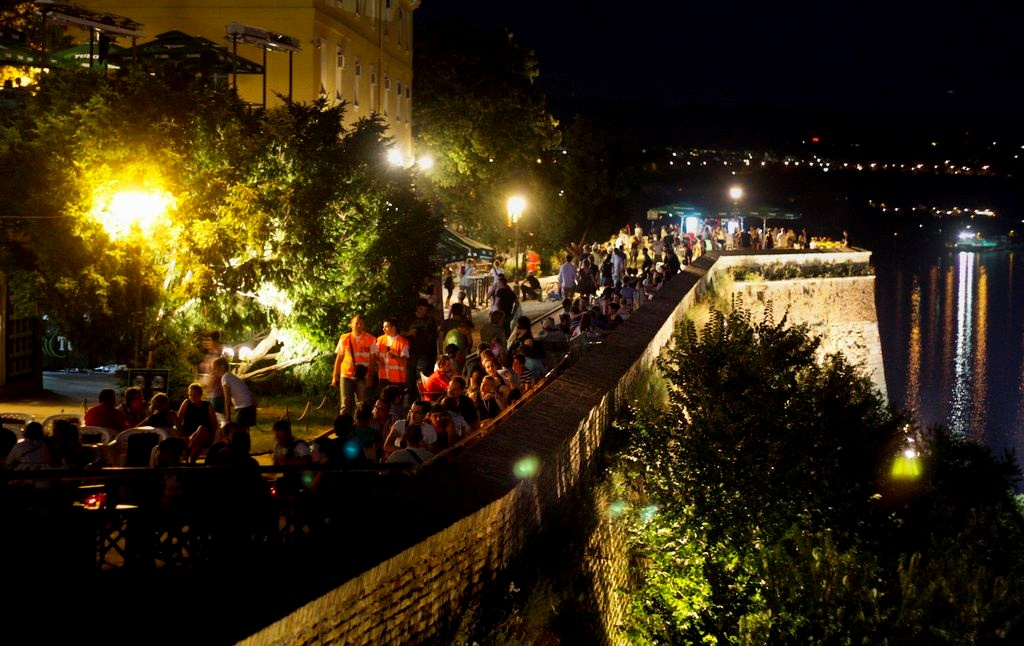
Petrovaradin Fortress at night

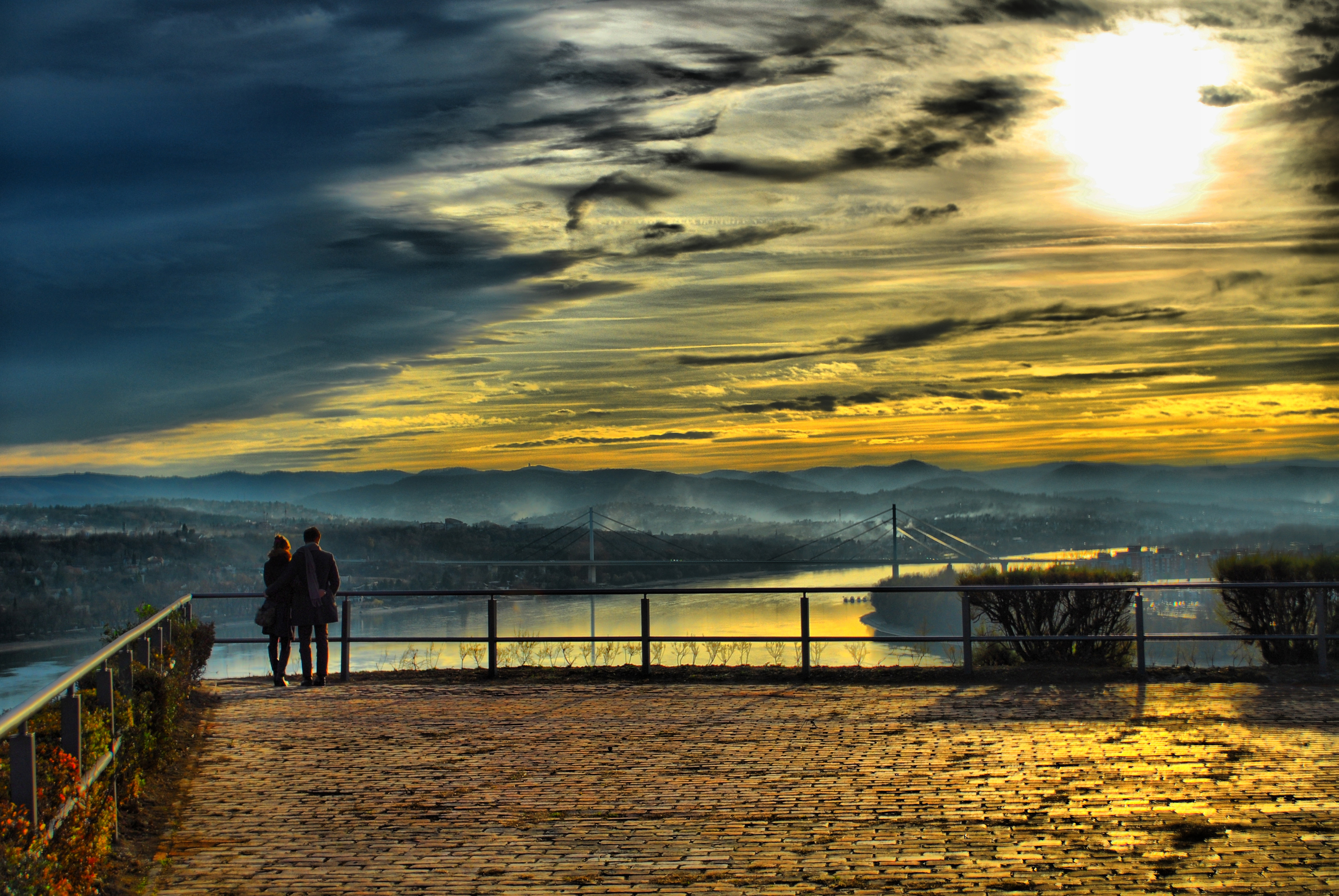
Petrovaradin

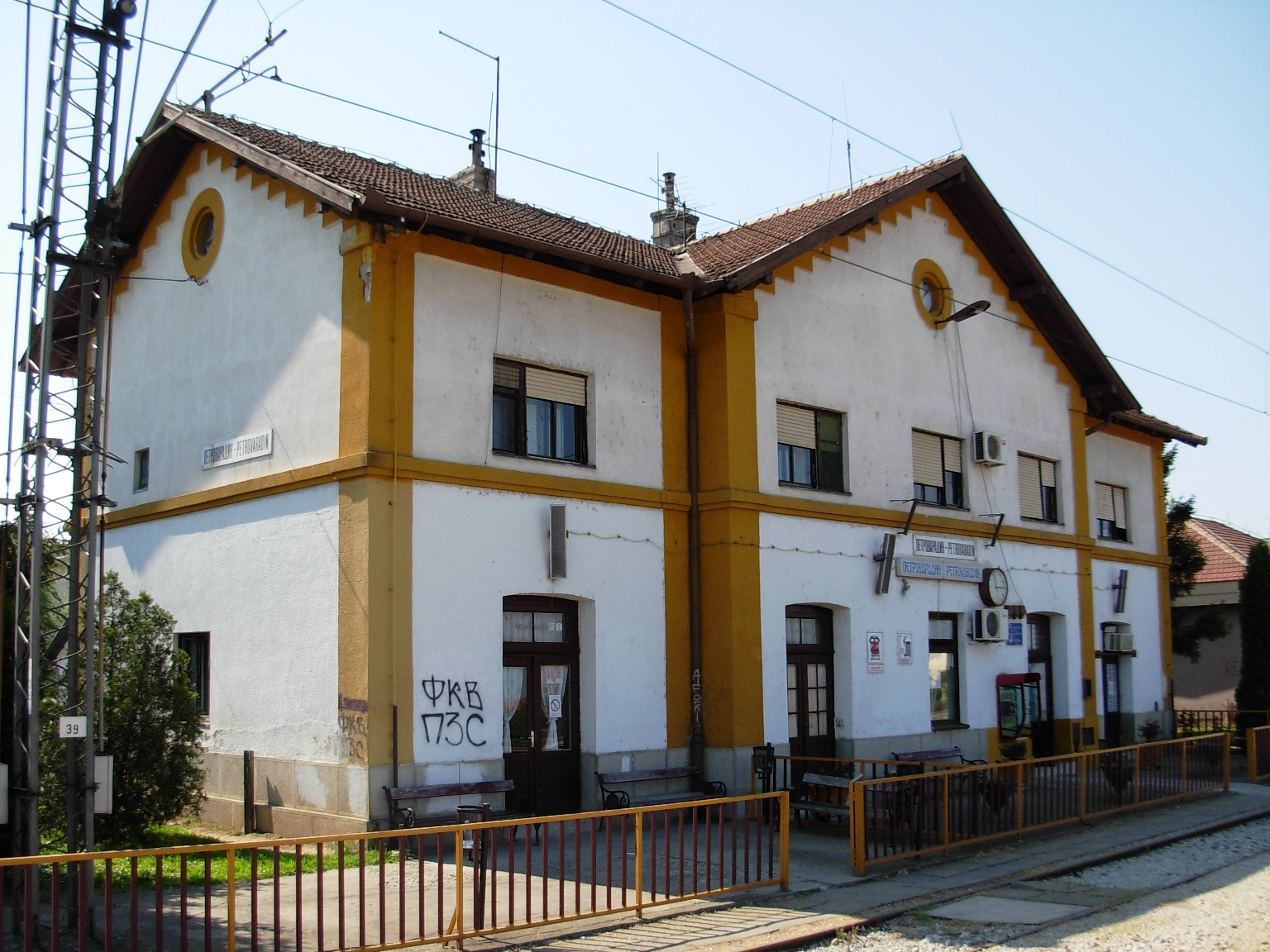
Petrovaradin railway station

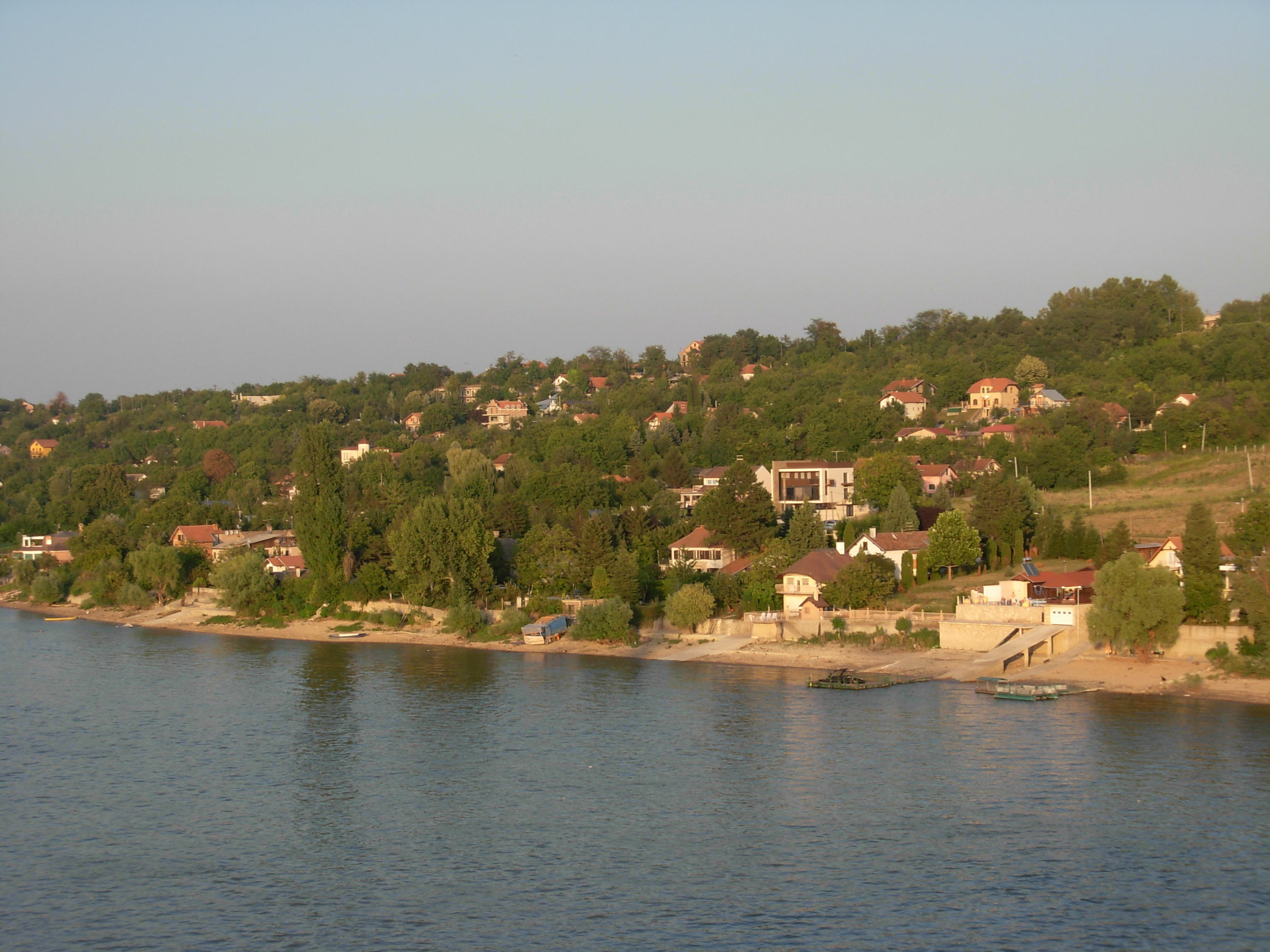
Ribnjak

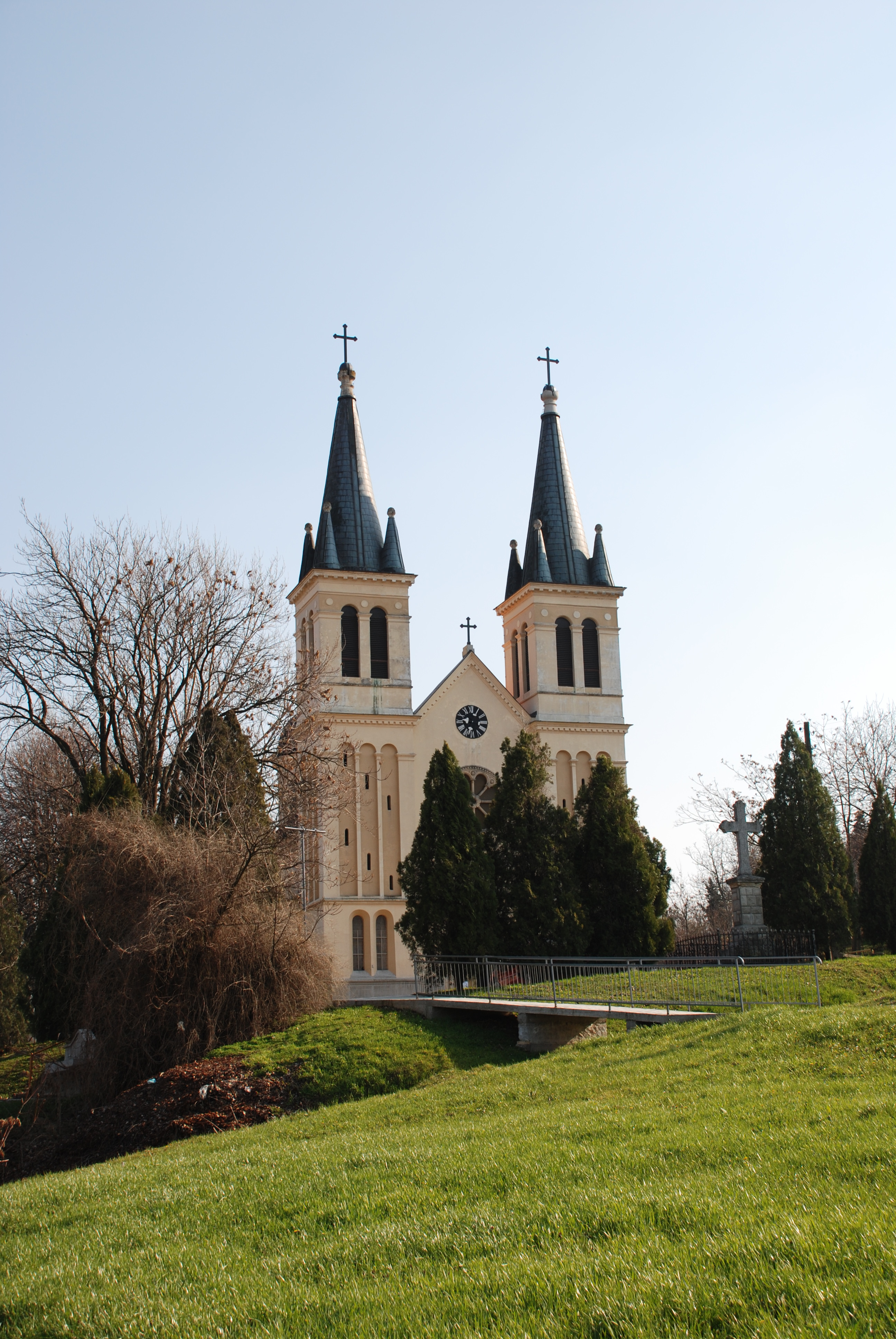
The Our Lady of Snow Ecumenic Church

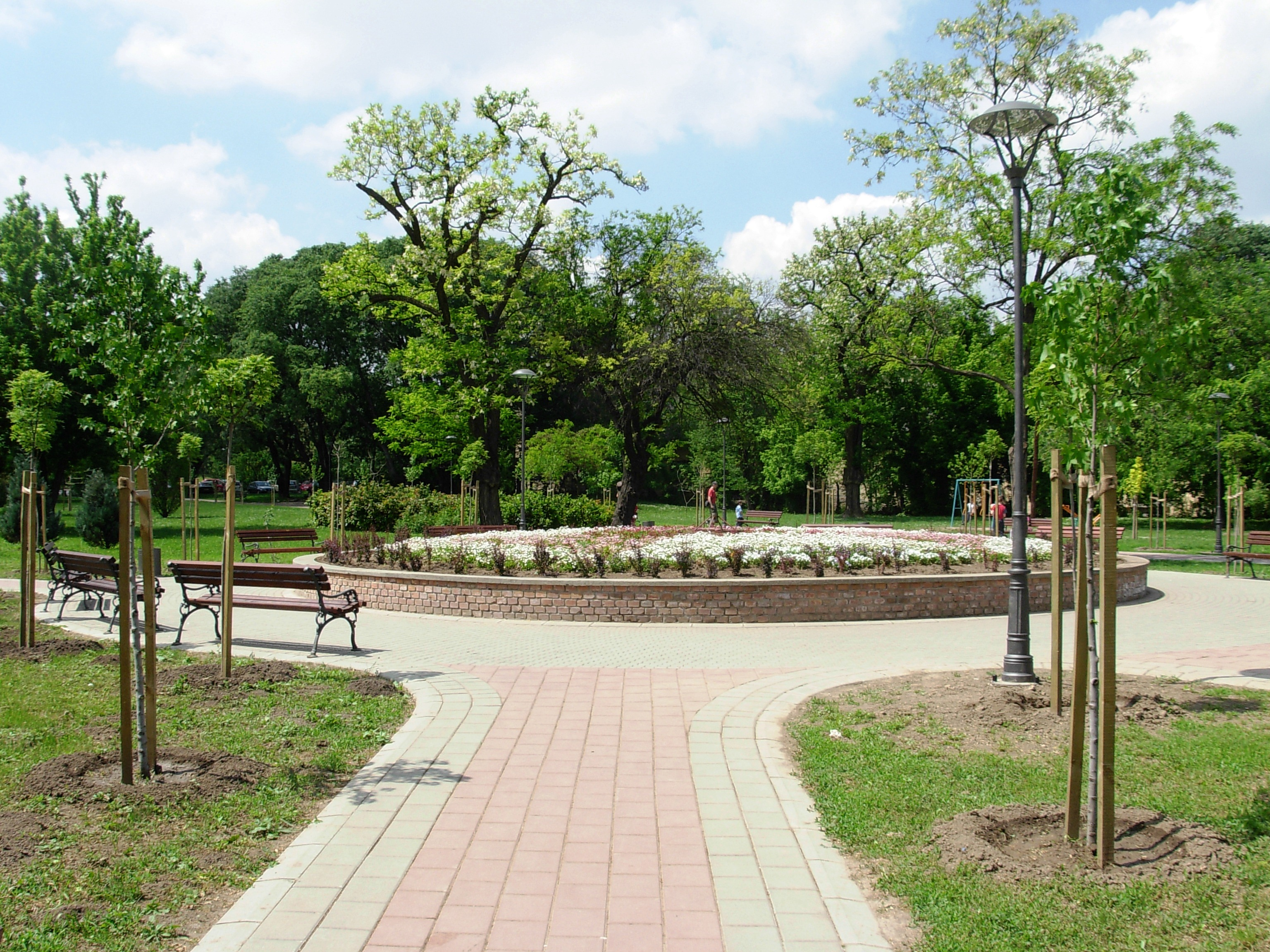
Molinari park

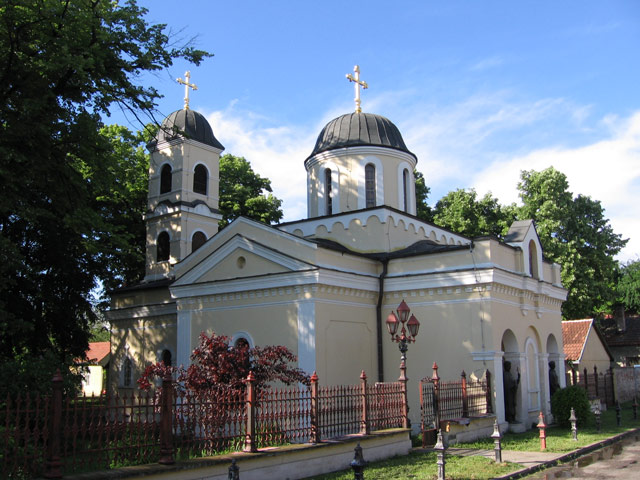
Serbian Orthodox Church of Saint Paul in Petrovaradin

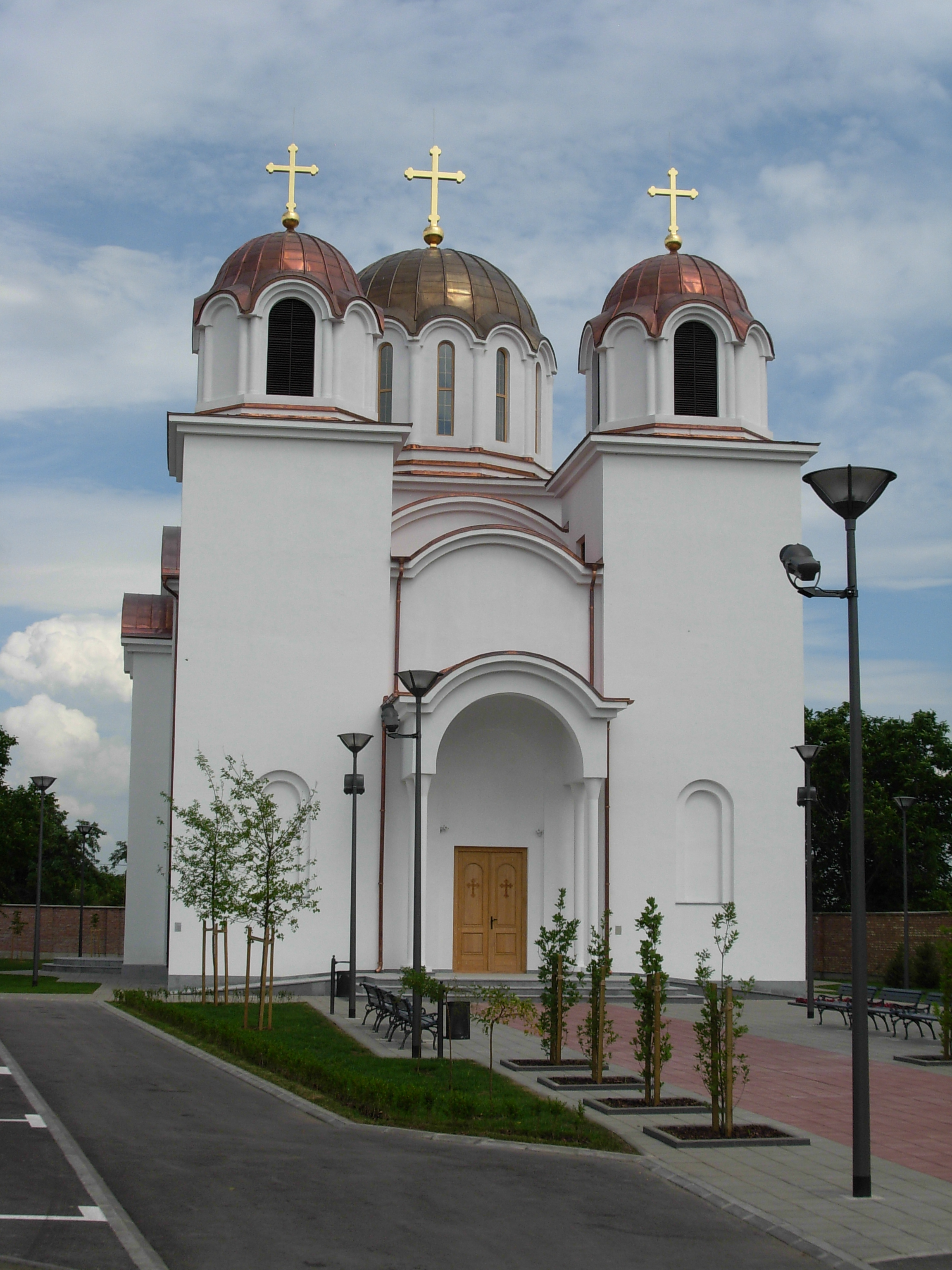
Serbian Orthodox Church of Saint Petka in Petrovaradin

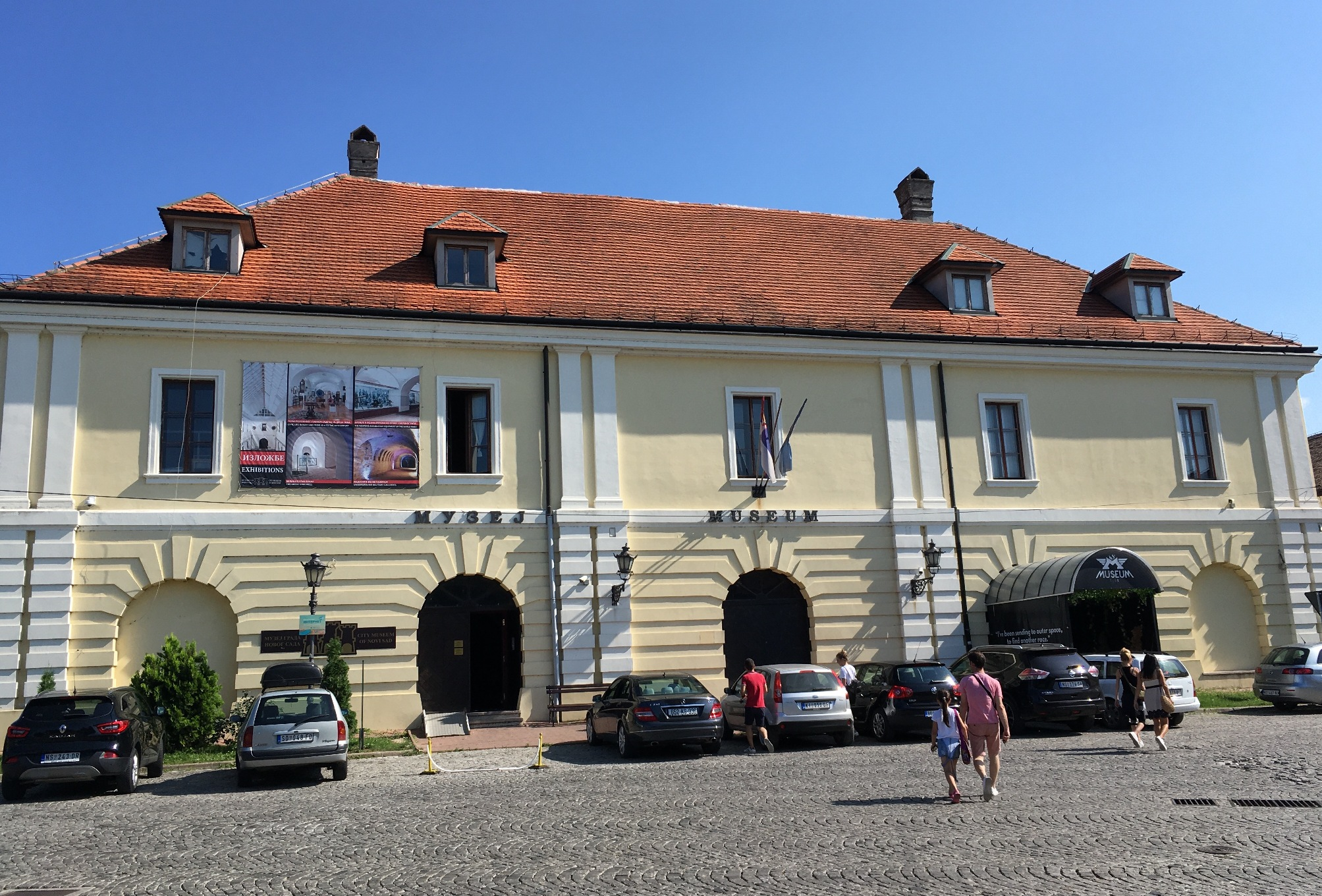
City museum in Petrovaradin

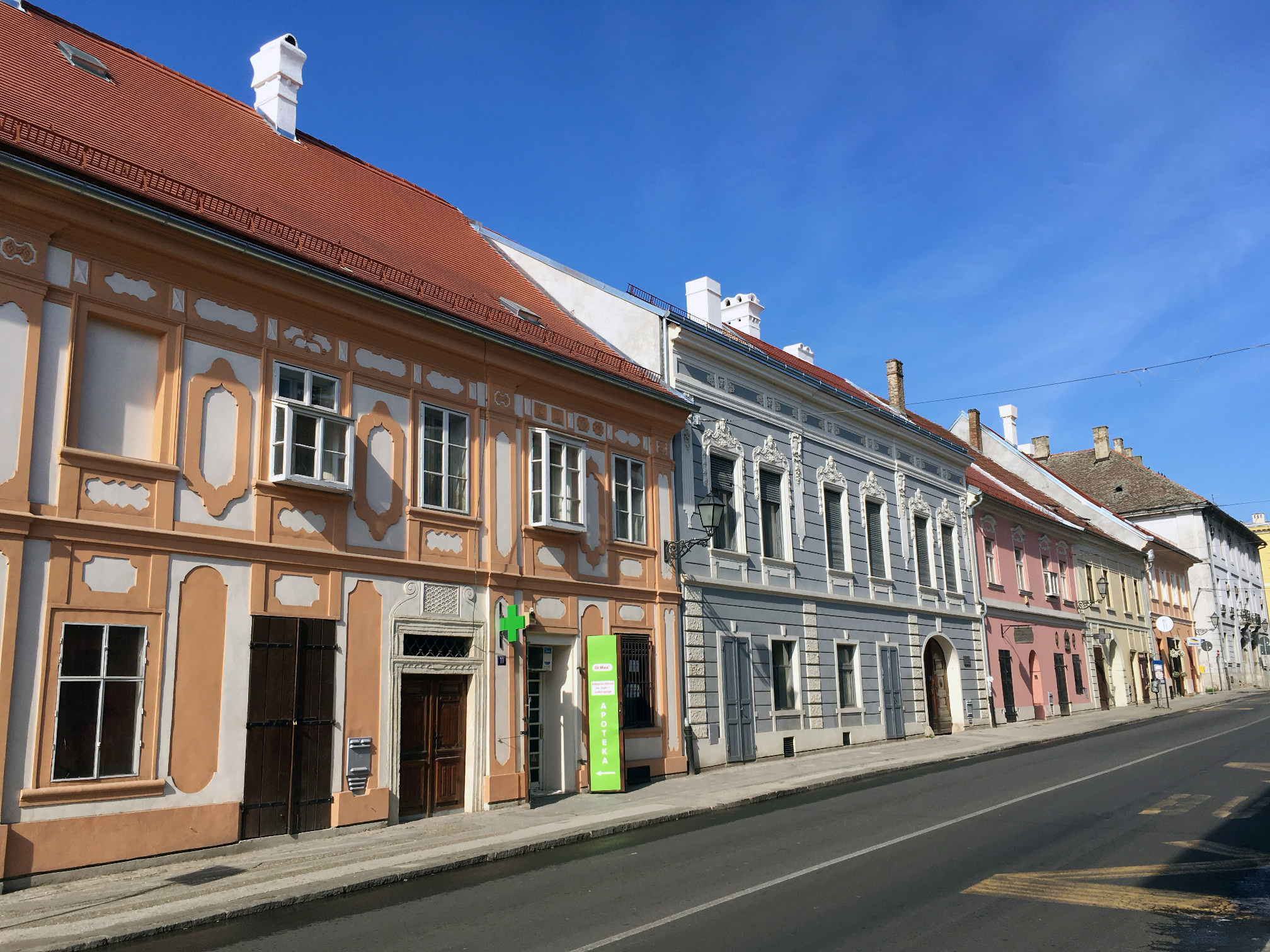
Petrovaradin, Downtown part of the Citadel

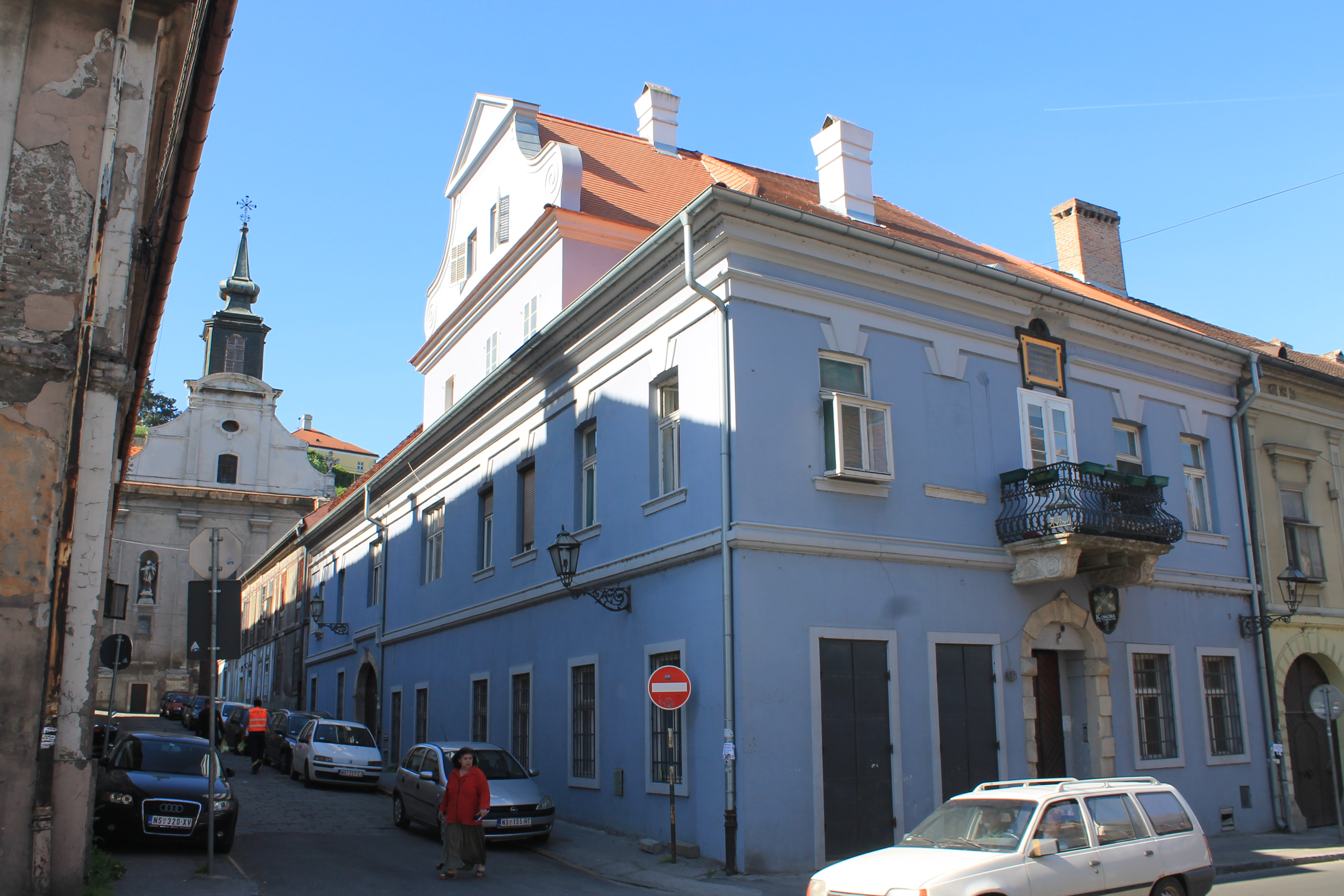
The birthplace of Ban Josip Jelačić

== Notable people ==
- Anton Hasenhut (1766–1841), Austrian comic actor
- Josip Jelačić (1801–1859), Croatian ban and army general, born in Petrovaradin.
- Christian von Steeb, (1848–1921), Austrian surveyor and infantry general
- Franjo Štefanović (1879–1924), Croatian composer and writer
- Margarethe von Flindt (1880–after 1902), Austrian theater actress
- Karl Wolff (1890–1963), Austrian lawyer, university lecturer and constitutional judge
- Kosta Nađ, (1911–1986), general in the Yugoslav National Liberation Army

== See also ==
- List of places in Serbia
- List of cities, towns and villages in Vojvodina

== Sources ==
- Đurić, Đorđe (2003). "Петроварадинска тврђава, дунавски Гибралтар на размеђу светова". Споменица Историјског архива "Срем". 2: 58–72. ISSN 1451-3676.
- Šeguljev, Nenad (2020). "Petrovaradinska tvrđava u zlatnom dobu vojne arhitekture". DANS - Časopis za arhitekturu i urbanizam.
- Vučković, Miljena; Dajč, Katarina (2019). "Analysis of the purposes, uses and users of the Petrovaradin Fortress" (PDF). Petro Varad In: Dossier. pp. 32-. ISBN 978-86-85871-40-5.
- Vranić, Milan (1963). Petrovaradin. Jugoslavija.
- "Petrovaradin Fortress (Novi Sad, Serbia): Tourism Spatial Planning and Design of The Upper Town for the Function of Cultural Tourism" (PDF). Turizam. 15 (2): 65–76. 2011.
- "Petrovaradin Fortress" (PDF). Turistička organizacija Novi Sad. 2024.
