= Novo Selo =

Novo Selo (lit. 'new village' in several Slavic languages) may refer to the following places:

== Albania ==
- Novoselë, a municipality in the Vlorë District
- Novoselë, Kolonjë, a municipality in the Kolonjë District
- Benjë-Novoselë, a village in the municipality of Përmet, Gjirokastër County
- Novoselë, Maliq, a village in the municipality of Maliq, Korçë County

== Austria ==
- Novo Selo, Croatian name for Neudorf bei Parndorf, a place in Burgenland

== Bosnia and Herzegovina ==
- Novo Selo, Brod, a village near Brod
- Novo Selo, Bijeljina, a village near Bijeljina
- Novo Selo, Bosanski Brod, a village near Bosanski Brod
- Novo Selo, Šamac, a village near Bosanski Šamac
- Novo Selo, Donji Vakuf, a village near Donji Vakuf
- Novo Selo, Gradiška, a village near Gradiška
- Novo Selo, Kupres, Canton 10, a village near Kupres, Canton 10
- Novo Selo, Kupres, Republika Srpska, a village near Kupres, Republika Srpska
- Novo Selo, Odžak, formerly called Balegovac, a village near Odžak
- Novo Selo, Prnjavor, a village near Prnjavor
- Novo Selo, Sokolac, a village near Sokolac
- Novo Selo, Tešanj, a village near Tešanj
- Novo Selo, Zenica, a village near Zenica
- Novo Selo, Zvornik, a village near Zvornik

== Bulgaria ==
=== Places currently named Novo Selo ===
- Novo Selo, Kyustendil Province, Kyustendil Province
- Novo Selo, Plovdiv Province, Plovdiv Province
- Novo Selo, Ruse Province, Ruse Province
- Novo Selo, Sliven Province, presently uninhabited, part of the Novo Selo military training range
- Novo Selo, Sofia Province, Sofia Province
- Novo Selo, Stara Zagora Province, Stara Zagora Province
- Novo Selo, Veliko Tarnovo Province, Veliko Tarnovo Province
- Novo Selo, Vidin Province, seat of Novo Selo municipality, Vidin Province
- The former village of Novo Selo, today a quarter of Apriltsi, Lovech Province
- Dolno Novo Selo, Sofia Province
- Dolno Novo Selo, Stara Zagora Province
- Gorno Novo Selo, Stara Zagora Province
- Gorsko Novo Selo, Veliko Tarnovo Province

=== Places formerly named Novo Selo ===
- Blagoevo, Razgrad Province, Razgrad Province (until 1878)
- Blagovo, Montana Province, Montana Province (until 1949)
- Dalgopol, Varna Province (until 1934)
- Dragomirovo, Pernik Province, Pernik Province (until 1950)
- Dolno Pole, Haskovo Province (1906-1960)
- Gorno Selo, Sofia Province (until 1961)
- Mramor, Haskovo Province, Haskovo Province (until 1950)
- Ruzhitsa, Yambol Province, Yambol Province (until 1934)

== Croatia ==
- Novo Selo, Brač, a village near Selca
- Novo Selo, Bjelovar-Bilogora County, a village near Čazma
- Novo Selo, Požega-Slavonia County, a village near Požega
- Novo Selo, Sisak-Moslavina County, a village near Sisak
- Novo Selo, Zagreb County, a village near Vrbovec
- Novo Selo Bosiljevsko, a village near Bosiljevo
- Novo Selo Garešničko, a village near Berek
- Novo Selo Glinsko, a village near Glina
- Novo Selo Koreničko, a village near Plitvička Jezera
- Novo Selo Lasinjsko, a village near Lasinja
- Novo Selo Okićko, a village near Klinča Sela
- Novo Selo, Oriovac, a former village in Brod-Posavina County
- Novo Selo Palanječko, a village near Sisak
- Novo Selo Perjasičko, a village near Barilović
- Novo Selo Podravsko, a village near Mali Bukovec, Varaždin County
- Novo Selo Rok, a village near Čakovec
- Novo Selo, Slunj, a village in Karlovac County
- Novo Selo na Dravi, a village near Čakovec
- Novo Selo Žumberačko, a village near Samobor
- Donje Novo Selo, Croatia, a village near Nijemci
- Ličko Novo Selo, a village near Đurđenovac
- Našičko Novo Selo, a village near Đurđenovac
- Vinkovačko Novo Selo, a former village now neighbourhood of Vinkovci

== Greece ==
- Plevroma, formerly Novo Selo
- Krithia, Thessaloniki, formerly Novo Selo
- Neochorouda, also known as Novo Selo
- Agia Paraskevi, Thessaloniki, also known as Novo Selo

== Kosovo ==
- Camp Novo Selo, military NATO camp in Novo Selo near Vushtrri; see Swisscoy
- Novo Selo (Kamenica), a village in Kamenica
- Novo Selo (Peja), a village in Peja
- Novo Selo (Prizren), a village in Prizren
- Novo Selo (Skenderaj), a village in Skenderaj
- Novo Selo (Viti), a village in Viti
- Novo Selo (Vushtrri), a village in Vushtrri

== Montenegro ==
- Novo Selo, Danilovgrad, a village in Danilovgrad Municipality

== North Macedonia ==
- Novo Selo, Debarca, a village in Debarca municipality
- Novo Selo, Demir Hisar, a village in Demir Hisar municipality
- Novo Selo, Čaška, a village in Čaška municipality
- Novo Selo, Gjorče Petrov, a town in Gjorče Petrov Municipality
- Novo Selo, Mavrovo and Rostuša, a village in Municipality of Mavrovo and Rostuša
- Novo Selo, Kočani, a village in Kočani municipality
- Novo Selo, Kumanovo, a village in Kumanovo municipality
- Novo Selo Municipality, a municipality in eastern North Macedonia
- Novo Selo, Novo Selo, a village in Novo Selo municipality
- Novo Selo, Štip, a village in Štip municipality
- Novo Selo, Struga, a village in Struga municipality
- Novo Selo, Kičevo, a village in Kičevo municipality
- Novo Selo, Veles, a village in Veles municipality
- Novo Selo, Zelenikovo, a village in Zelenikovo municipality
- Novo Selo, Želino, a village in Želino municipality
- Novo Selo, Bogovinje, a village in Bogovinje Municipality

== Serbia ==
- Bačko Novo Selo, in northern Serbia, in the municipality of Bač
- Banatsko Novo Selo, in northern Serbia, in the municipality of Pančevo
- Novo Selo (Kanjiža), a village in northern Serbia, in the municipality of Kanjiža
- Novo Selo (Raška), a village in Raška municipality, Raška District
- Novo Selo (Surdulica), a village in Surdulica municipality, Pčinja District
- Novo Selo (Trgovište), a village in Trgovište municipality, Pčinja District
- Novo Selo (Vladimirci), a village in Vladimirci, Mačva District
- Novo Selo (Loznica), a village in Loznica
- Novo Selo (Velika Plana), a village in Velika Plana, Podunavski District
- Novo Selo (Sokobanja), a village in Sokobanja
- Novo Selo (Vrnjačka Banja), a village in Vrnjačka Banja, Raška District
- Novo Selo (Raška), a village in Raška District
- Novo Selo (Gadžin Han), a village in Gadžin Han, Nišava District
- Novo Selo (Kuršumlija), a village in Kuršumlija
- Novo Selo (Prokuplje), a village in Prokuplje
- Novo Selo (Bela Palanka), a village in Bela Palanka, Pirot District
- Novo Selo (Lebane), a village in Lebane
- Novo Selo (Leskovac), a village in Leskovac
- Deveti Maj (old name Novo Selo), a village in Palilula, Niš

== Slovakia ==
- Devinsko Novo Selo, former name of Devínska Nová Ves, a borough of Bratislava

== See also ==
- Staro Selo (disambiguation)
- Nova Sela (disambiguation)
- Novosel, Shumen Province, Bulgaria
- Novoselec, Croatia
- Novoselets, Sliven Province, Bulgaria
- Novoselishte, Kardzhali Province, Bulgaria
- Novo Selište, Croatia
- Novoseltsi, Vidin Province, Bulgaria
- Novoselci (disambiguation)
- Novoselyane, Kyustendil Province, Bulgaria
