= Staro Selo =

Staro Selo is a Slavic toponym meaning "old village" and may refer to the following villages:

== Bosnia and Herzegovina ==
- Staro Selo (Glamoč)
- Staro Selo (Donji Vakuf)
- Staro Selo (Kalesija)

== Bulgaria ==
- Staro Selo, Lovech Province, in Troyan Municipality
- Staro Selo, Silistra Province, in Tutrakan Municipality
- Staro Selo, Pernik Province, in Radomir Municipality
- Staro Selo, Vratsa Province, in Mezdra Municipality

== Croatia ==
- Staro Selo, Sisak-Moslavina County, a village near Sisak
- Staro Selo, Lika-Senj County, a village near Otočac
- Staro Selo, Topusko, a village near Topusko

== Montenegro ==
- Staro Selo, Nikšić

== North Macedonia ==
- Staro Selo, Jegunovce

== Slovenia ==
- Staro Selo, Kobarid

== Serbia ==
- Staro Selo (Jagodina)
- Staro Selo (Prokuplje)
- Staro Selo (Velika Plana)

== See also ==
- Novo Selo (disambiguation)
- Stara Sela, Kamnik Municipality, Slovenia
