= Desnes =

Desnes may refer to:

- Desnes, a historical province in Scotland, roughly equivalent to southern Kirkcudbrightshire
- Desnes, Jura, a commune in the French region of Franche-comté

See also

- Desne
