= Matijevići, Kula Norinska =

Matijevići
- Village
- Location of Matijevići in Croatia
- Coordinates: 43°02′13″N 17°36′14″E
- Country: Croatia
- County: Dubrovnik–Neretva
- Municipality: Kula Norinska

Area
  - Total: 0.3 km^{2} (0.12 sq mi)

Population (2021)
  - Total: 90
  - Density: 300/km^{2} (780/sq mi)
- Time zone: UTC+1 (CET)
  - Summer (DST): UTC+2 (CEST)

Matijevići is a village in the Kula Norinska municipality, near Metković. It is situated between the village of Kula Norinska and Momići.

== Demographics ==
Historical population
Year	Pop.	±%
1880	22	—
1890	25	+13.6%
1900	34	+36.0%
1910	39	+14.7%
1921	0	−100.0%
1931	0	0.00%
1948	67	—
1953	80	+19.4%
1961	75	−6.2%
1971	75	+0.0%
1981	93	+24.0%
1991	246	+164.5%
2001	100	−59.3%
2011	98	−2.0%
2021	89	−9.2%
Source: Census
