= Nova Sela =

Nova Sela ("New Villages") may refer to:

- Nova Sela, Trilj, a village near Trilj, Croatia
- Nova Sela, Omiš, a village near Omiš, Croatia
- Nova Sela, Kula Norinska, a village near Kula Norinska, Croatia
- Nova Sela, Kostel, a village near Kostel, Slovenia

== See also ==
- Stara Sela ("Old Villages"), a village near Kamnik, Slovenia
- Novo Selo (disambiguation)
