= Podrujnica =

- Village
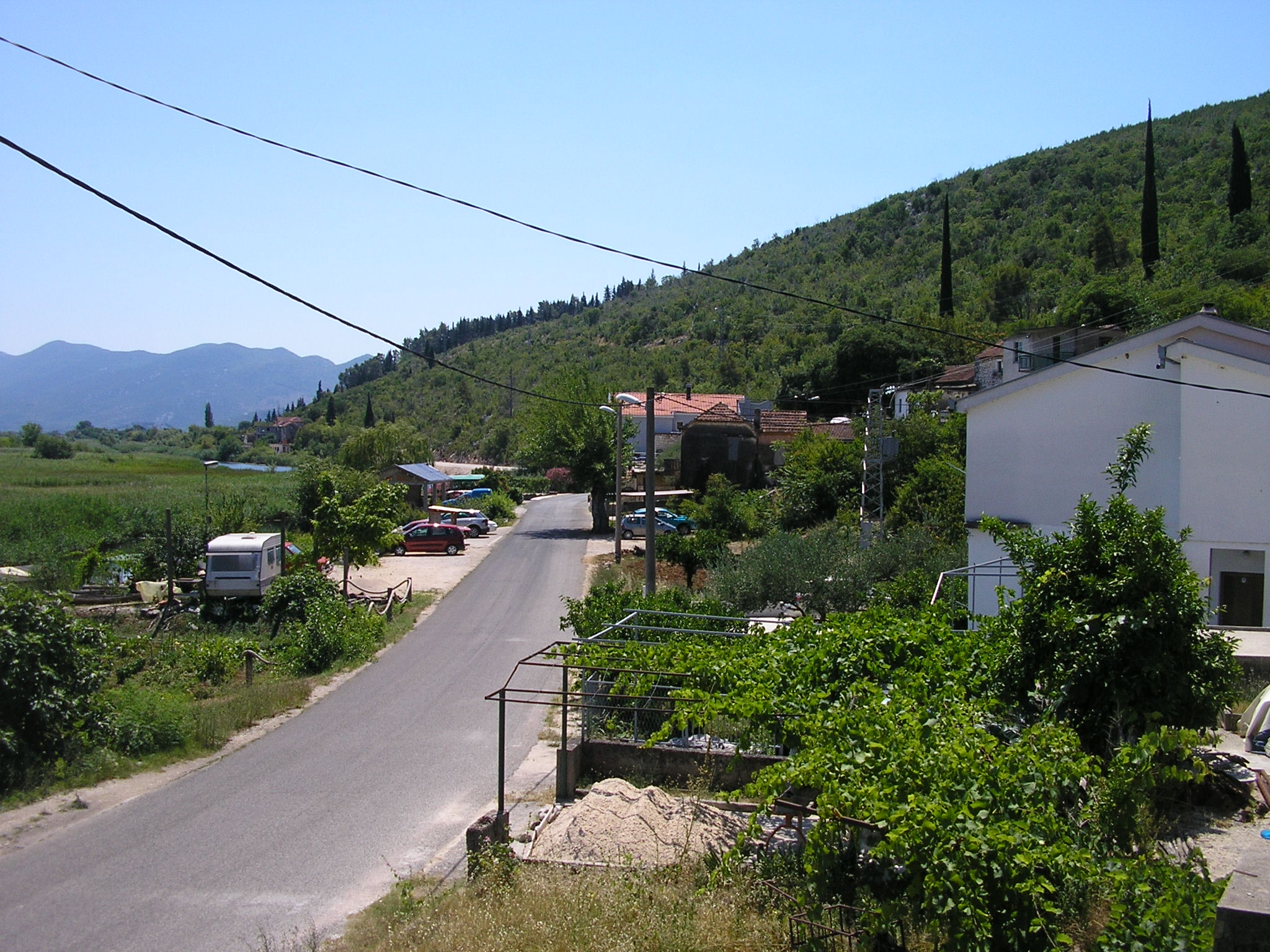

- Location of Podrujnica in Croatia
- Coordinates: 43°04′N 17°35′E
- Country: Croatia
- County: Dubrovnik–Neretva
- Municipality: Kula Norinska

Area
  - Total: 4.6 km^{2} (1.8 sq mi)

Population (2021)
  - Total: 109
  - Density: 24/km^{2} (61/sq mi)
- Time zone: UTC+1 (CET)
  - Summer (DST): UTC+2 (CEST)

Podrujnica is a village in the Kula Norinska municipality.

== Architecture ==
=== Chapel and Church of Saint Roch ===
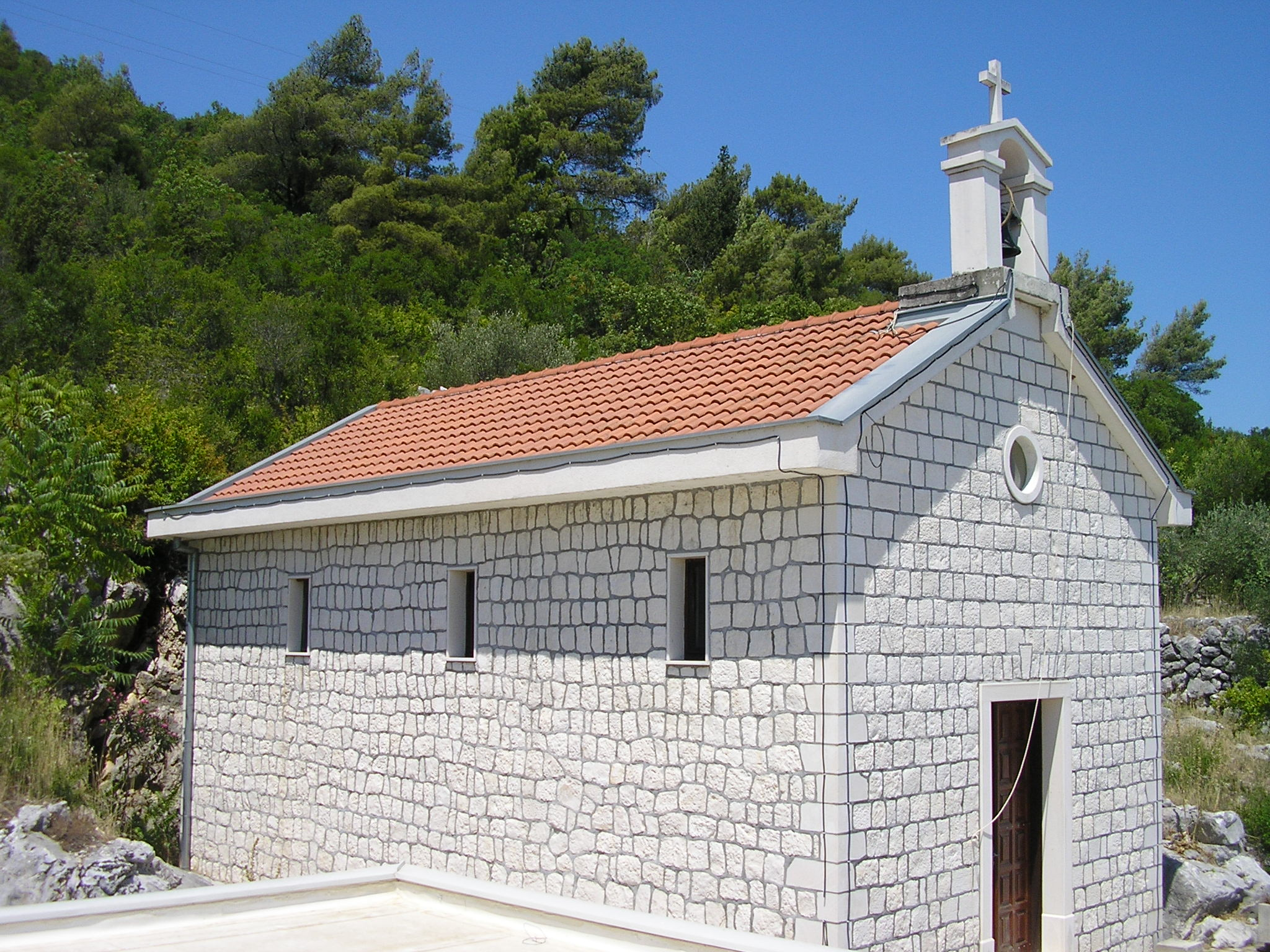
Church of Saint Roch

The 11x6 metre Church of Saint Roch had started construction during the time of pastor Zrinko Brković, and it was completed in 2008 when Nikola Bodrožić was pastor. It replaced the old chapel.

The 8x4 metre concrete chapel had been built during the time of pastor Špirko Vuković. It was blessed by bishop Ivo Gugić on 10 September 1972. The belfry had three bells and a cross. It had continued the tradition of the old chapel of Saint Roch on Rujnica in Desne, from where a large chunk of the populace moved to Podrujnica in the beginning of the 20th century.

== Demographics ==
Historical population
Year	Pop.	±%
1880	87	—
1890	142	+63.2%
1900	116	−18.3%
1910	202	+74.1%
1921	410	+103.0%
1931	222	−45.9%
1948	248	+11.7%
1953	267	+7.7%
1961	289	+8.2%
1971	213	−26.3%
1981	169	−20.7%
1991	122	−27.8%
2001	142	+16.4%
2011	135	−4.9%
2021	110	−18.5%
Source: Census

(Note: In 1856 and 1869 it was counted as part of Desne, as well as a chunk in 1880. In 1921, the village Kula Norinska was counted as part of it.)
