= Krvavac =

- Village

- Location of Krvavac in Croatia
- Coordinates: 43°01′41″N 17°35′10″E
- Country: Croatia
- County: Dubrovnik–Neretva
- Municipality: Kula Norinska

Area
  - Total: 6.3 km^{2} (2.4 sq mi)

Population (2021)
  - Total: 417
  - Density: 66/km^{2} (170/sq mi)
- Time zone: UTC+1 (CET)
  - Summer (DST): UTC+2 (CEST)

Krvavac is a village in the Kula Norinska municipality.

== Demographics ==
Historical population
Year	Pop.	±%
1880	473	—
1890	537	+13.5%
1900	636	+18.4%
1910	442	−30.5%
1921	795	+79.9%
1931	916	+15.2%
1948	744	−18.8%
1953	743	−0.1%
1961	739	−0.5%
1971	700	−5.3%
1981	589	−15.9%
1991	508	−13.8%
2001	613	+20.7%
2011	577	−5.9%
2021	428	−25.8%
Source: Census

== Architecture and parish ==
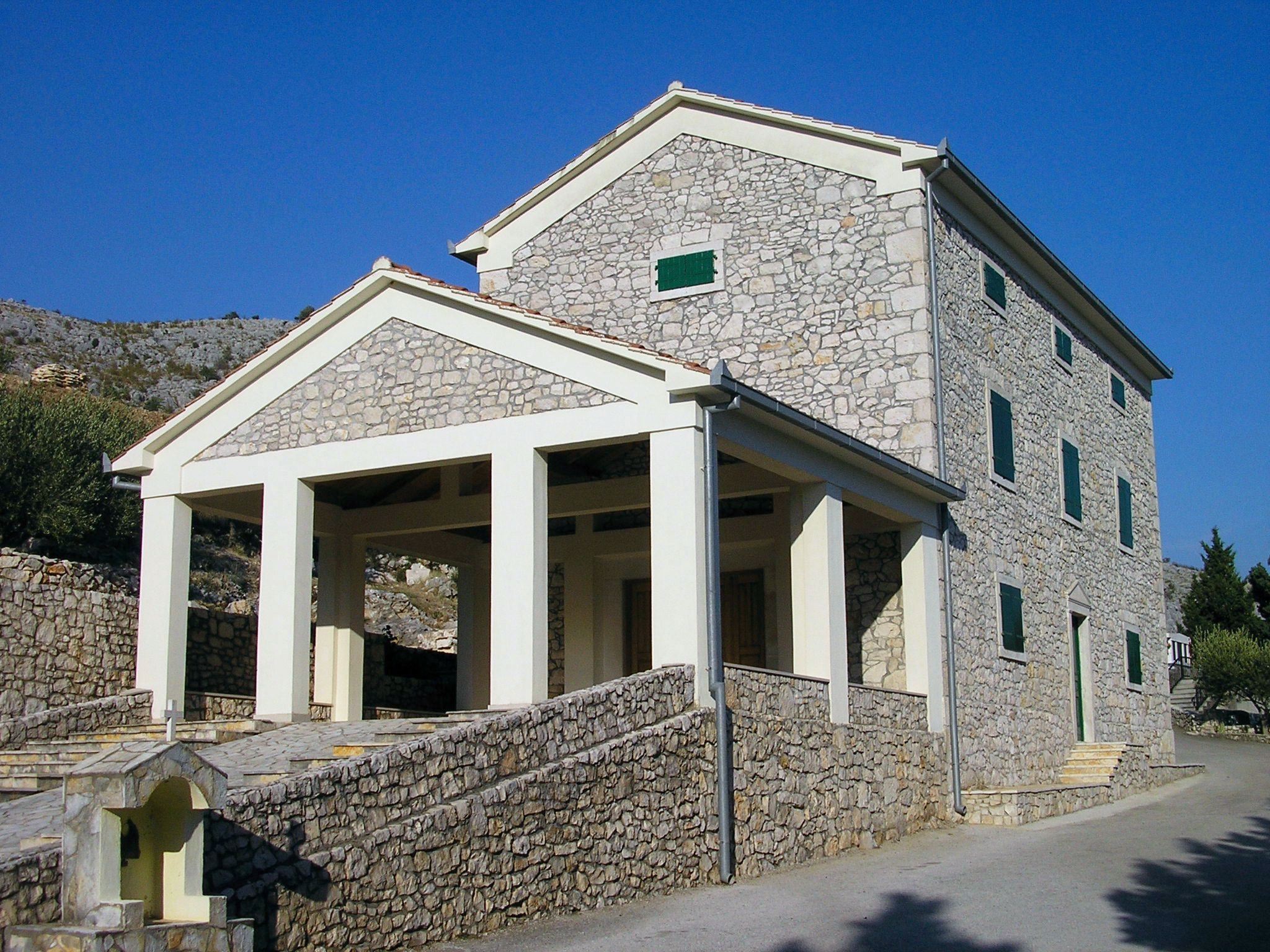
The former parish church, now a morgue

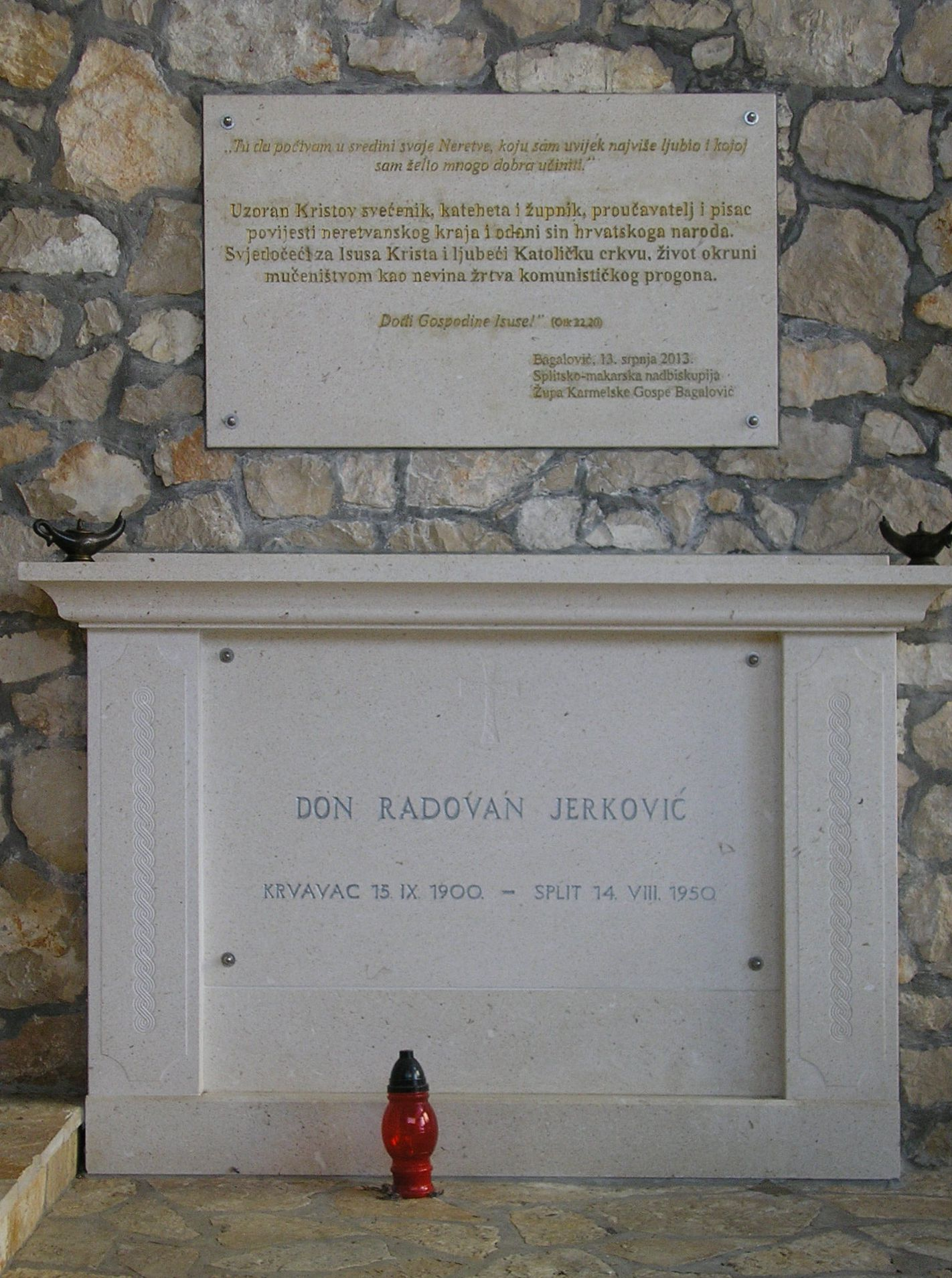
The grave of pastor Radovan Jerković

The parish was created by the Yugoslav Ministry of Religion on 5 August 1921, by dividing the parish Desne-Bagalovići.

=== Parish church of Our Lady of Carmel Bagalović ===
The 20.7x8 metre church was built in Bagalović in 1865 in place of the older chapel built in 1790. It was financed by the pastors and the government in Zadar. It was built with improperly cut stone. During the time of pastor Mirko Bašićin 1926, a belfry with three bells was built. It was renovated in 1991 when Stjepan Barišić was pastor.

=== Church of Saint Martin of Porers ===
The 10x6.15 meter church is located in the place of the former church tavern. When Barišić was pastor in 1997, a belfry was constructed, and the roof renovated.

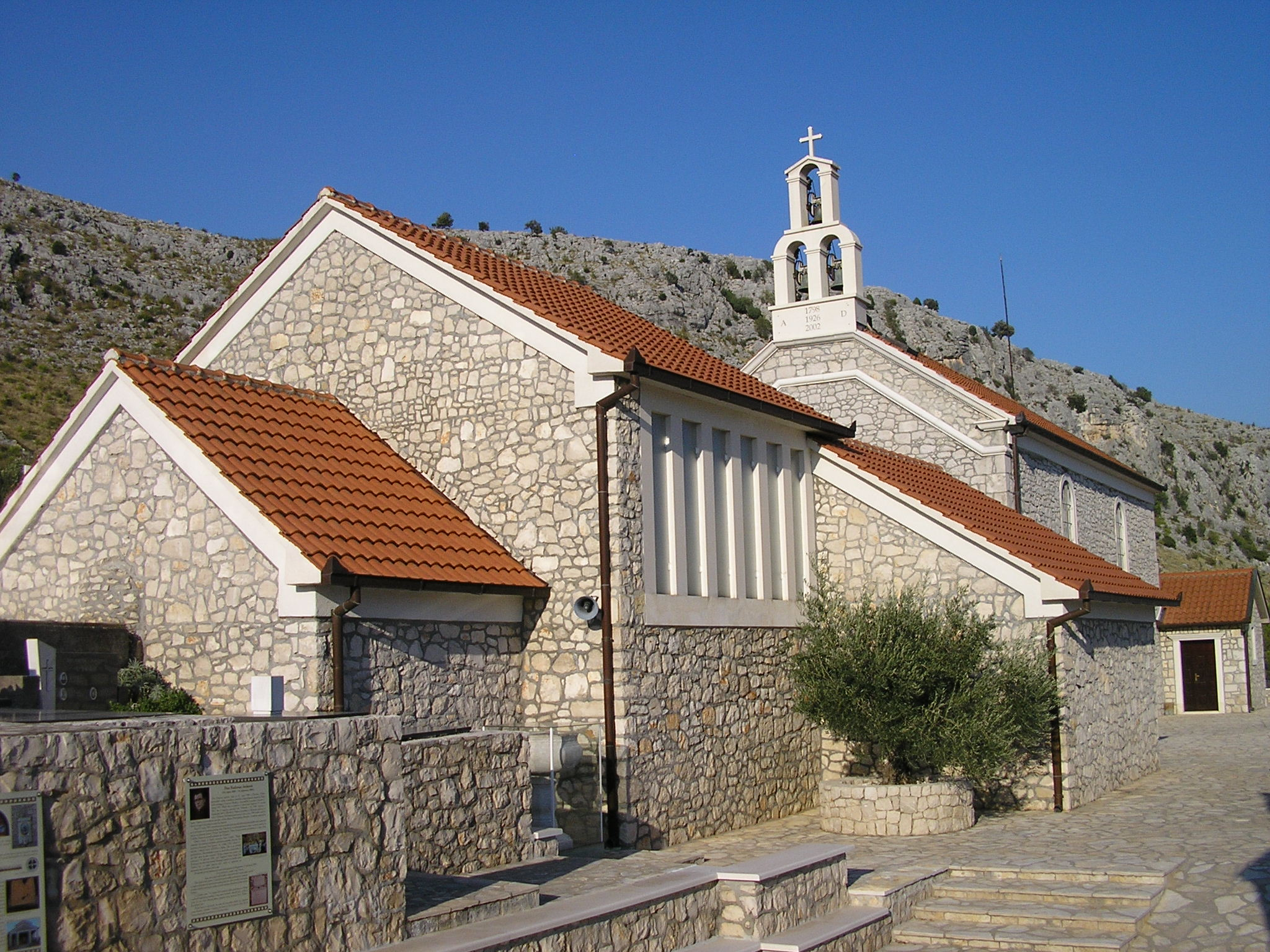
Church of Our Lady of Carmel

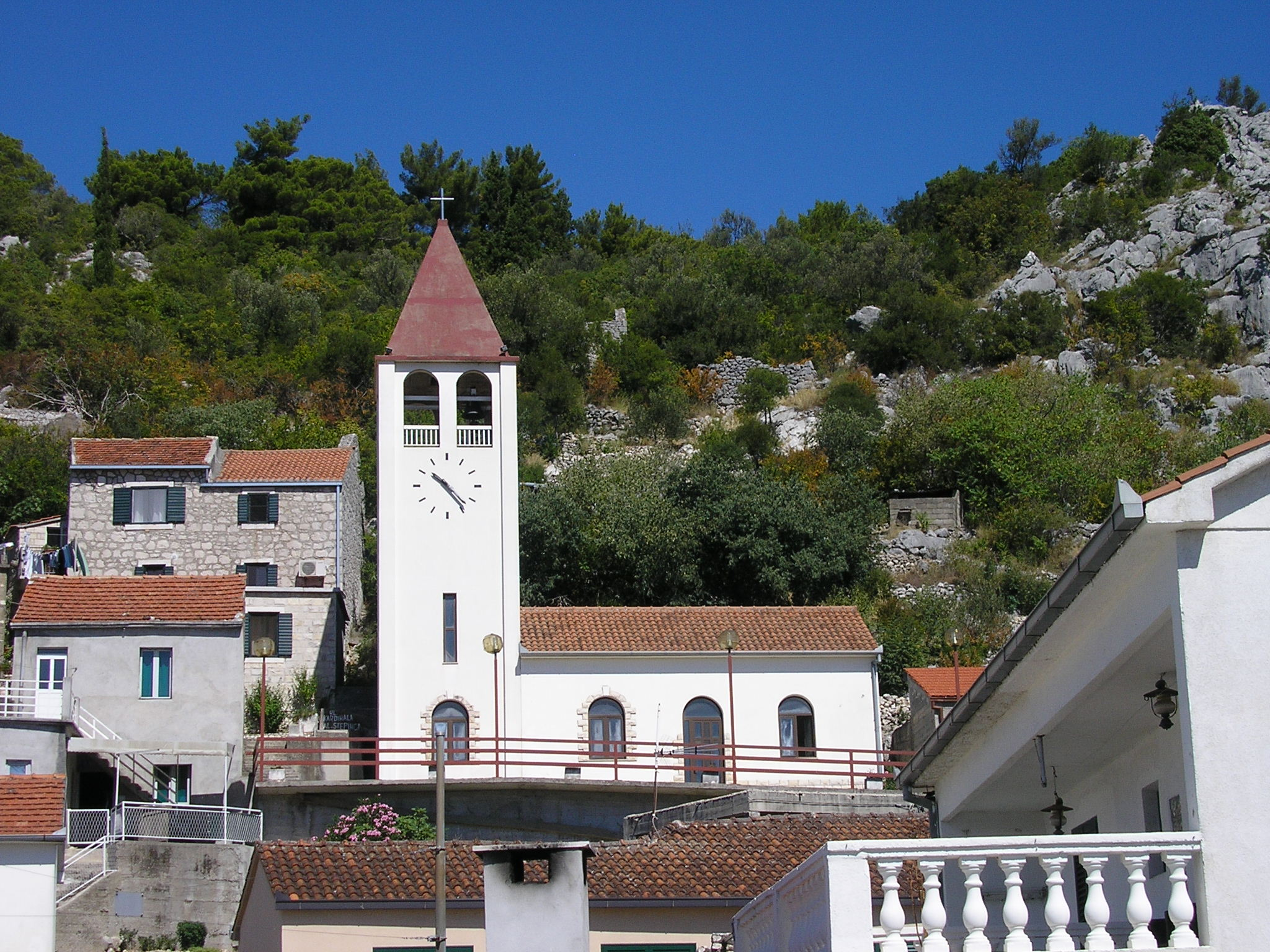
Church of Saint Martin

== Education ==
A volksschule was opened on 7 October 1922, as the 20th school in the then Metković kotar(district). The first teacher was Urica Batinović from Opuzen.
