= Beljevina =

Village in Croatia

- Village
- Interactive map of Beljevina
- Coordinates: 45°33′47″N 18°01′31″E
- Country: Croatia
- County: Osijek-Baranja County

Population (2011)
  - Total: 712

Beljevina is a village near Đurđenovac, Croatia. In the 2011 census, it had 712 inhabitants.
