= Krvavac II =

- Village
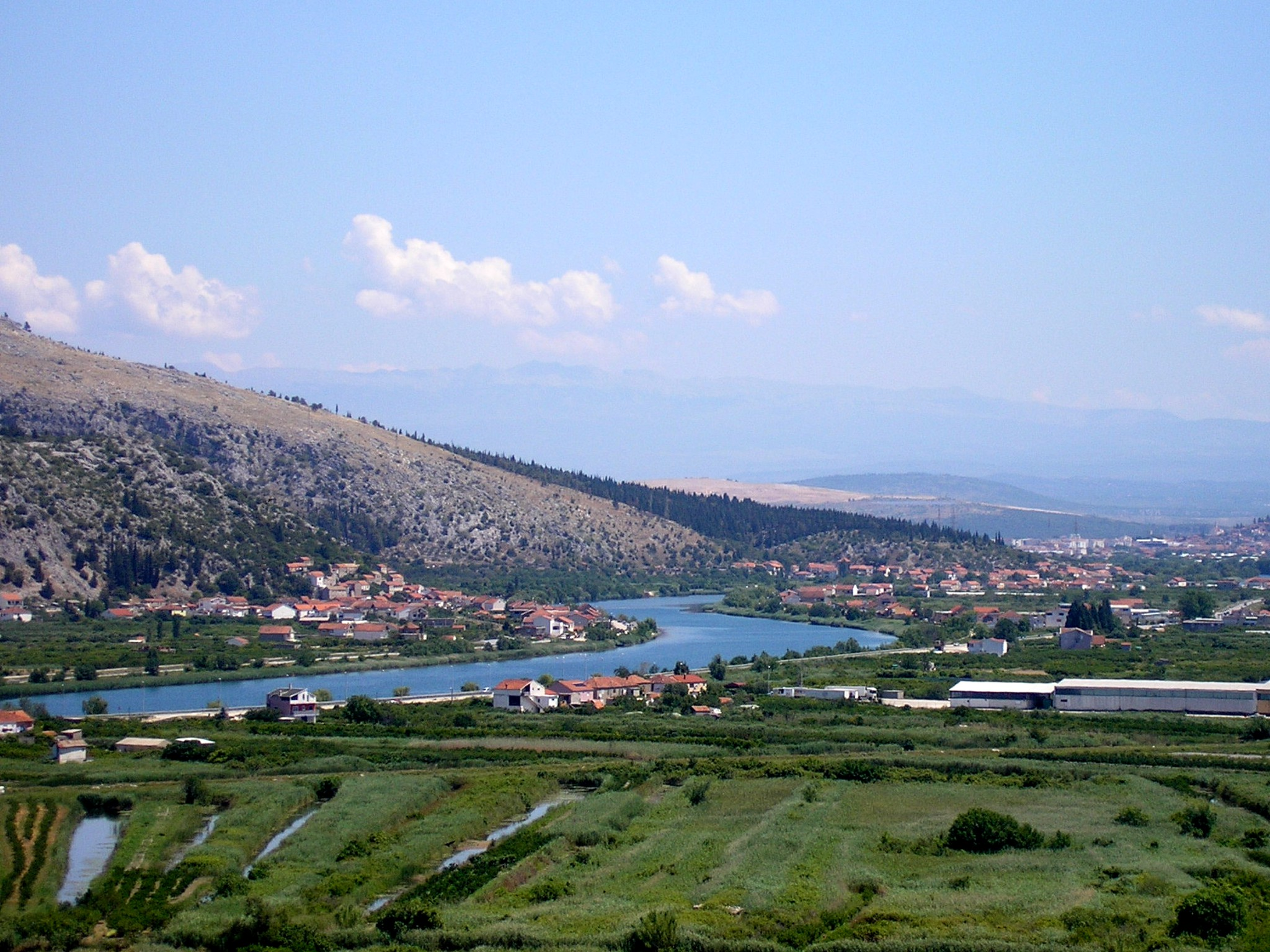

- Location of Krvavac II in Croatia
- Coordinates: 43°01′32″N 17°35′46″E
- Country: Croatia
- County: Dubrovnik–Neretva
- Municipality: Kula Norinska

Area
  - Total: 5.1 km^{2} (2.0 sq mi)

Population (2021)
  - Total: 260
  - Density: 51/km^{2} (130/sq mi)
- Time zone: UTC+1 (CET)
  - Summer (DST): UTC+2 (CEST)

Krvavac II is a village in the Kula Norinska municipality.

== Demographics ==
Historical population
Year	Pop.	±%
1948	55	—
1953	94	+70.9%
1961	154	+63.8%
1971	221	+43.5%
1981	237	+7.2%
1991	292	+23.2%
2001	336	+15.1%
2011	334	−0.6%
2021	277	−17.1%
Source: Census
