= Šaptinovci =

Coordinates: 45°34′45″N 18°03′36″E

- Village (Selo)
- Interactive map of Šaptinovci

Šaptinovci is a village near Đurđenovac, Croatia. In the 2011 census, it had 543 inhabitants.
