= Nova Sela, Kula Norinska =

Village in Dubrovnik–Neretva, Croatia

Nova Sela
- Village
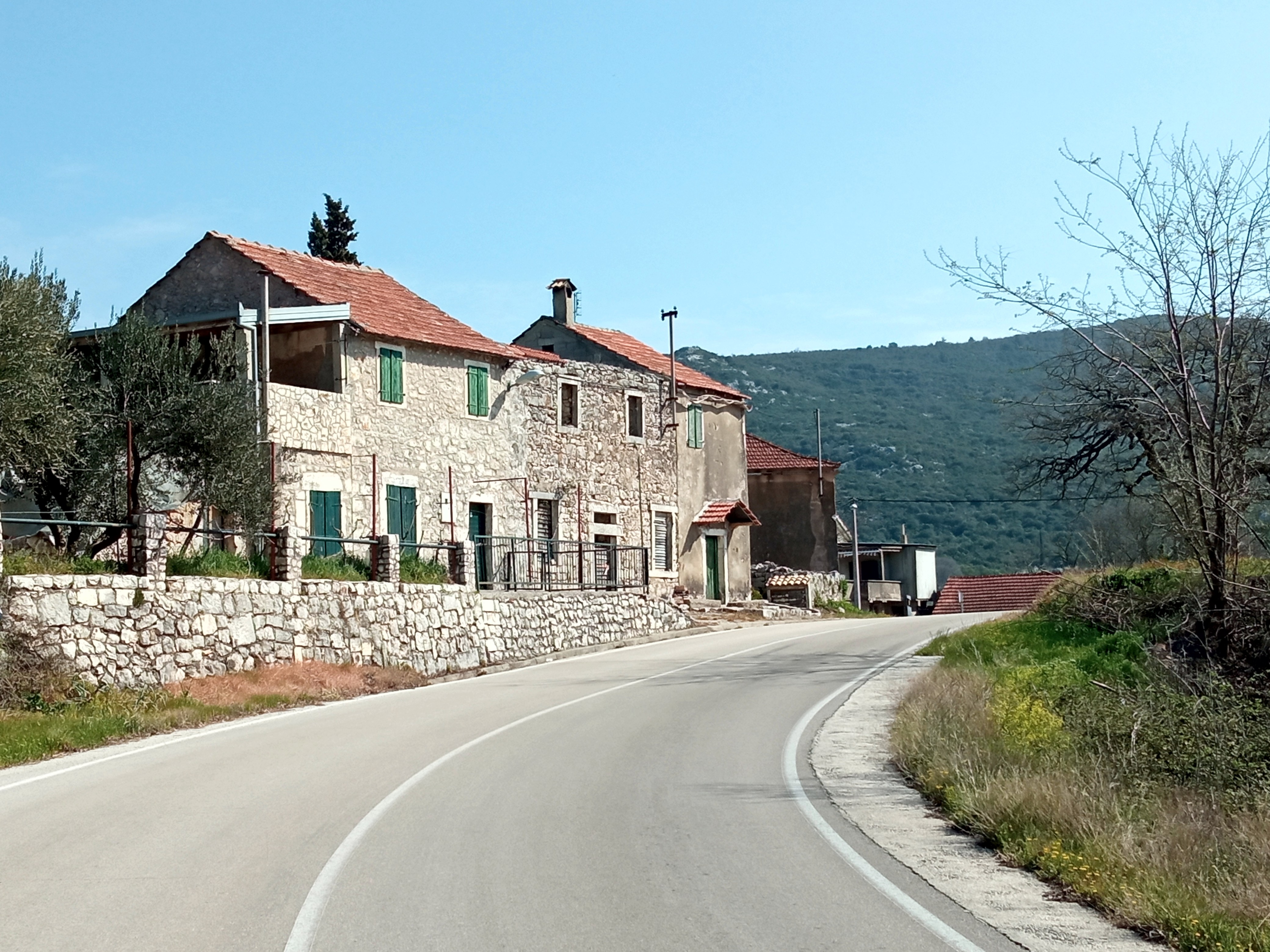

- Location of Nova Sela in Croatia
- Coordinates: 43°06′04″N 17°33′32″E
- Country: Croatia
- County: Dubrovnik–Neretva
- Municipality: Kula Norinska

Area
  - Total: 10.9 km^{2} (4.2 sq mi)
- Elevation: 53 m (174 ft)

Population (2021)
  - Total: 29
  - Density: 2.7/km^{2} (6.9/sq mi)
- Time zone: UTC+1 (CET)
  - Summer (DST): UTC+2 (CEST)

Nova Sela is a village between Metković and Vrgorac in the Kula Norinska municipality.

== History ==
The locality contains stećci from the 15th century. Emigrants from Herzegovina led by serdar Mate Bebić settled in Nova Sela after the Ottomans lost the village. Italian soldiers burnt down the original parish church in 1943 during World War II. After the conflict, Nova Sela was in the Borovci parish. A renovated building served as the church of the undivided parish. Today's Nova Sela parish was established on 26 September 1957.

== Architecture ==
=== Church of Saint Anthony ===
The church is located in the nearby Kulina. A chapel used to be there since at least 1774, when a marriage is recorded. It was torn down in 1830 and today's church was built. Its dimensions are 15x6 metres. The apse is squared and there's a sixteen-pointed rosette on the front. The belfry has three bells. A new altar was placed in 1965 when the bishop was Veselko Leutić. Thorough renewals happened in 1988 when the bishop was Dušan Brečić. A concrete platform was also built with a balcony for the bells. During the time of bishop Dušan Brečić in the late 1990s, it was removed because it had been considered unpleasant. A new roof was built in September 2003 during the time of bishop Ljubo Pavić, and the belfry was repaired.

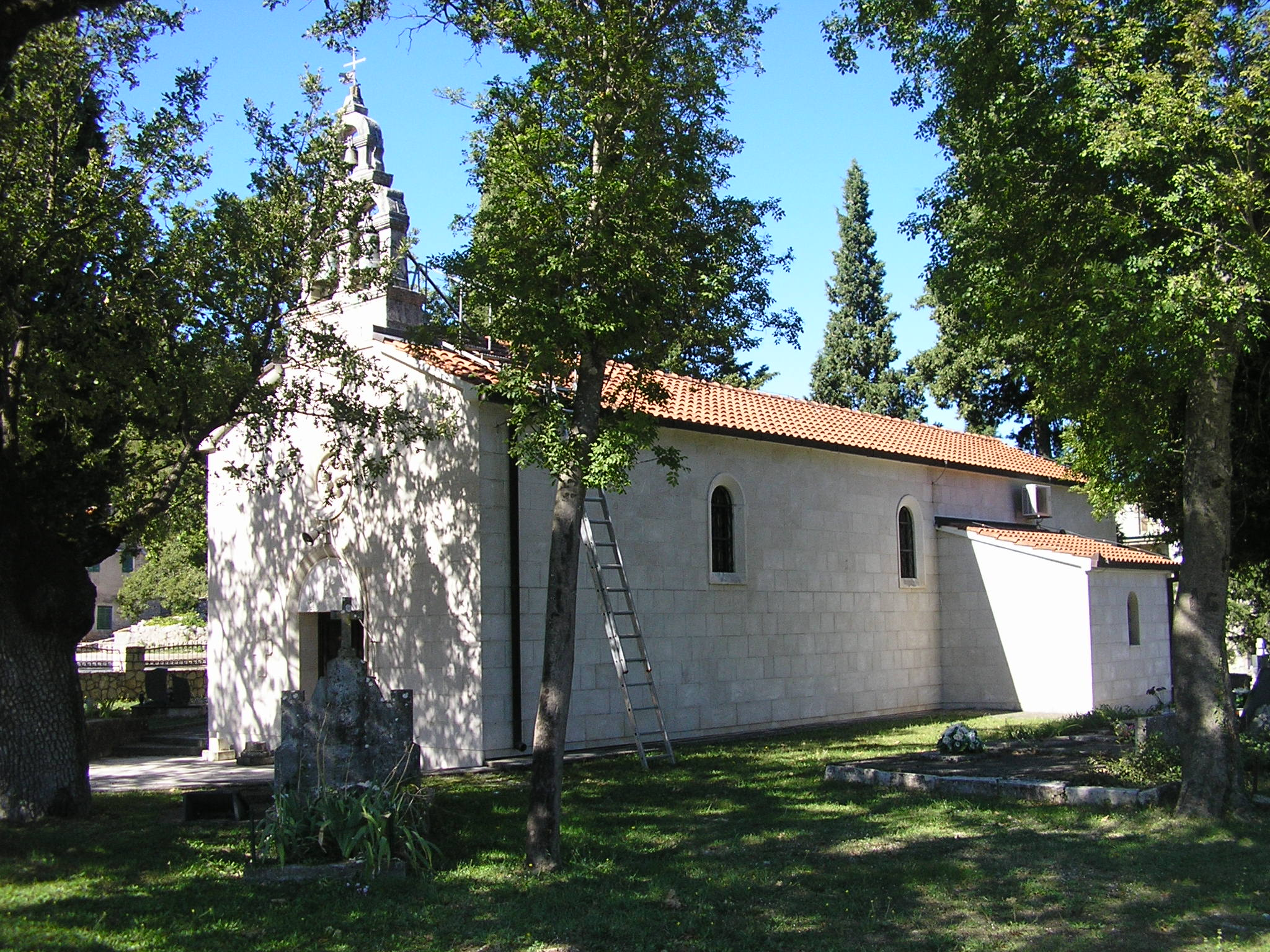
The Church of Saint Anthony

== Demographics ==
Historical population
Year	Pop.	±%
1880	320	—
1890	376	+17.5%
1900	431	+14.6%
1910	449	+4.2%
1921	524	+16.7%
1931	471	−10.1%
1948	428	−9.1%
1953	449	+4.9%
1961	432	−3.8%
1971	228	−47.2%
1981	107	−53.1%
1991	66	−38.3%
2001	55	−16.7%
2011	36	−34.5%
2021	32	−11.1%
Source: Census
