= Kula Norinska =

Municipality of Croatia

- Municipality
- View at Kula Norinska
- Interactive map of Kula Norinska
- Location within Croatia
- Country: Croatia
- County: Dubrovnik-Neretva County

Government
  - Mayor: Nikola Krstičević

Area
  - Municipality: 61.6 km^{2} (23.8 sq mi)
  - Urban: 1.0 km^{2} (0.39 sq mi)

Population (2021)
  - Municipality: 1,414
  - Density: 23.0/km^{2} (59.5/sq mi)
  - Urban: 205
  - Urban density: 200/km^{2} (530/sq mi)
- Time zone: UTC+1 (CET)
  - Summer (DST): UTC+2 (CEST)
- Postal code: 20350 Metković

Kula Norinska is a village and a municipality in the Dubrovnik-Neretva County in southeastern Croatia.

== Geography ==
The municipality is situated on the northern border of the Dubrovnik-Neretva County. It borders the City of Ploče, the City of Opuzen, the City of Metković, the Pojezerje Municipality, and the Zažablje Municipality. It borders Bosnia and Herzegovina to the north.

== History ==
=== Kula Norinska Fort ===
Kula Norinska (literally: Norin Fort) is a 16th-century fort next to the Neretva, opposite the mouth of the stream Norin, which was built by the Ottomans to defend against Venetian incursions. It's a protected cultural good.

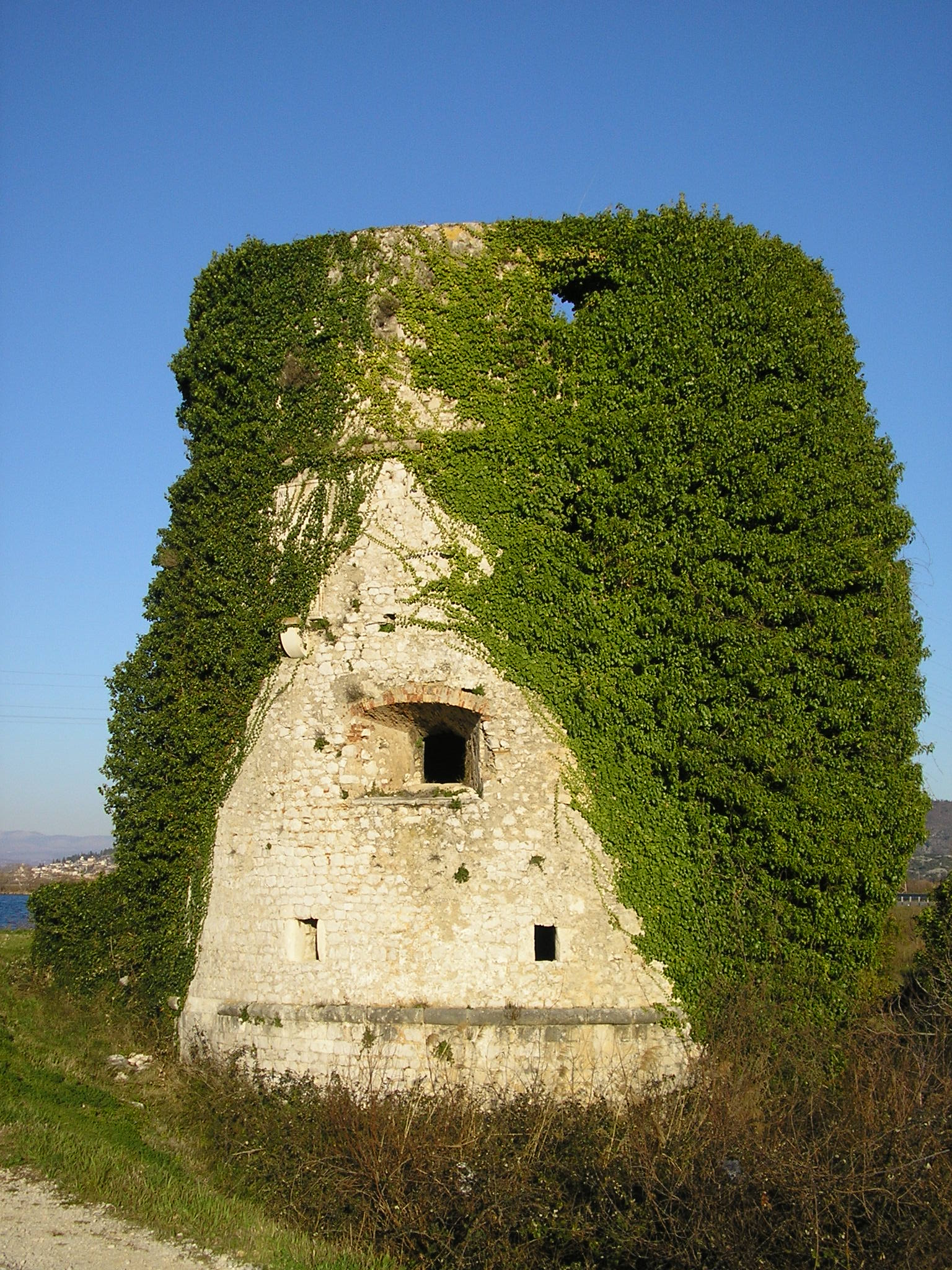
Kula Norinska

== Demographics ==
According to the 2021 census, the population of the municipality was 1,414, with 205 people living in the village of Kula Norinska itself.

=== Municipality ===
In 2021, the municipality consisted of the following 9 settlements:

- Borovci, population 30
- Desne, population 111
- Krvavac, population 417
- Krvavac II, population 260
- Kula Norinska, population 205
- Matijevići, population 90
- Momići, population 163
- Nova Sela, population 29
- Podrujnica, population 109

Historical population
Year	Pop.	±%
1857	1,654	—
1869	1,976	+19.5%
1880	2,202	+11.4%
1890	2,493	+13.2%
1900	2,891	+16.0%
1910	3,007	+4.0%
1921	2,988	−0.6%
1931	3,093	+3.5%
1948	3,165	+2.3%
1953	3,201	+1.1%
1961	3,097	−3.2%
1971	2,589	−16.4%
1981	2,047	−20.9%
1991	1,866	−8.8%
2001	1,926	+3.2%
2011	1,748	−9.2%
2021	1,446	−17.3%
Source: Census

Kula Norinska: Population trends 1857–2021
v

population	1654	1976	2202	2493	2891	3007	2988	3093	3165	3201	3097	2589	2047	1866	1926	1748	1414
	1857	1869	1880	1890	1900	1910	1921	1931	1948	1953	1961	1971	1981	1991	2001	2011	2021

Sources: Croatian Bureau of Statistics publications

=== Village ===
Historical population
Year	Pop.	±%
1931	201	—
1948	329	+63.7%
1953	317	−3.6%
1961	305	−3.8%
1971	384	+25.9%
1981	344	−10.4%
1991	145	−57.8%
2001	302	+108.3%
2011	250	−17.2%
2021	209	−16.4%
Source: Census

== Education ==
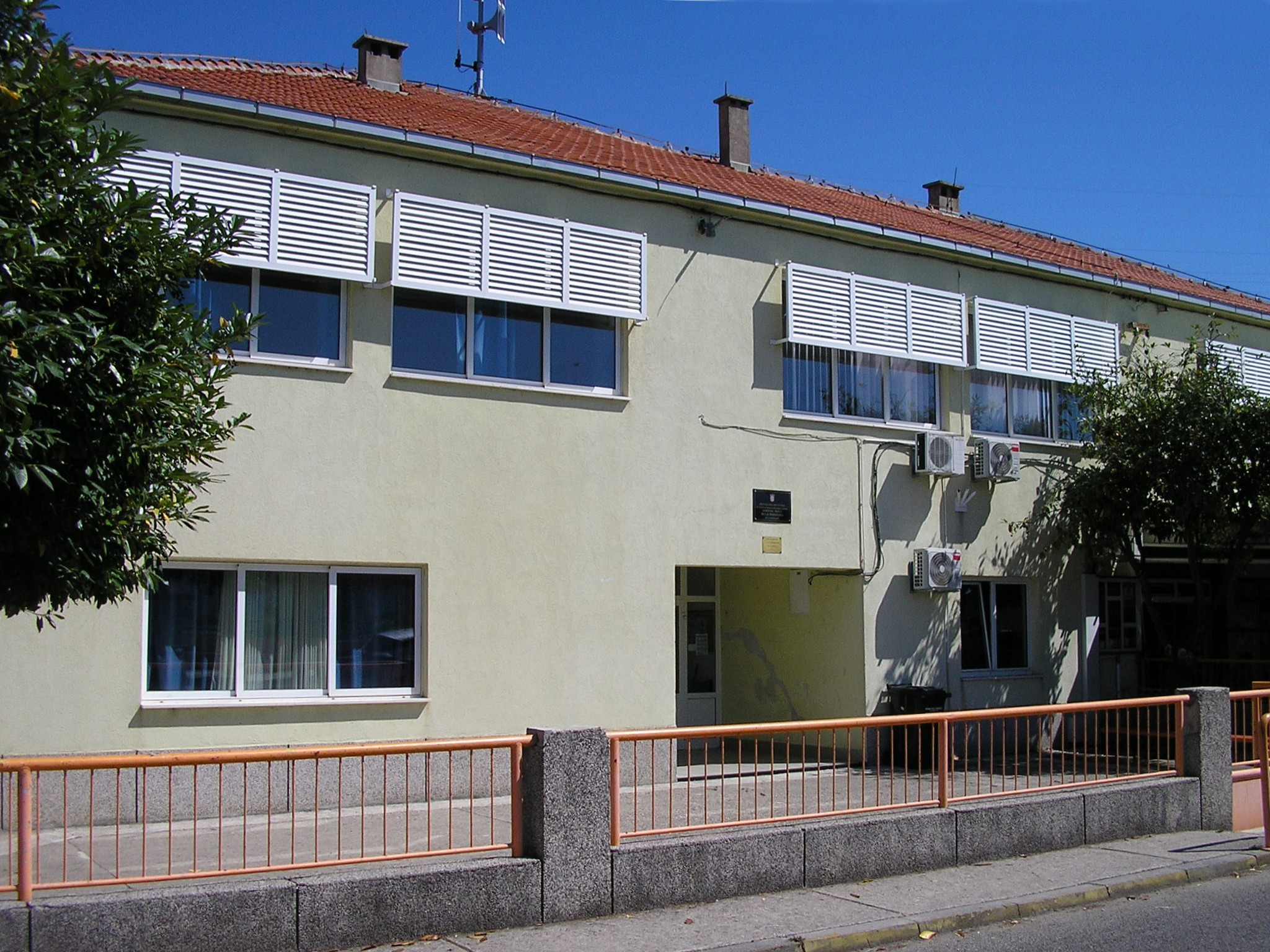
The elementary school

The elementary school "Kula Norinska" was founded in 1908, and in 1959 it started functioning as an eight-grade school. Because more space was needed, it was expanded on 1 February 1966.
