= Luka Bebić =

Croatian politician

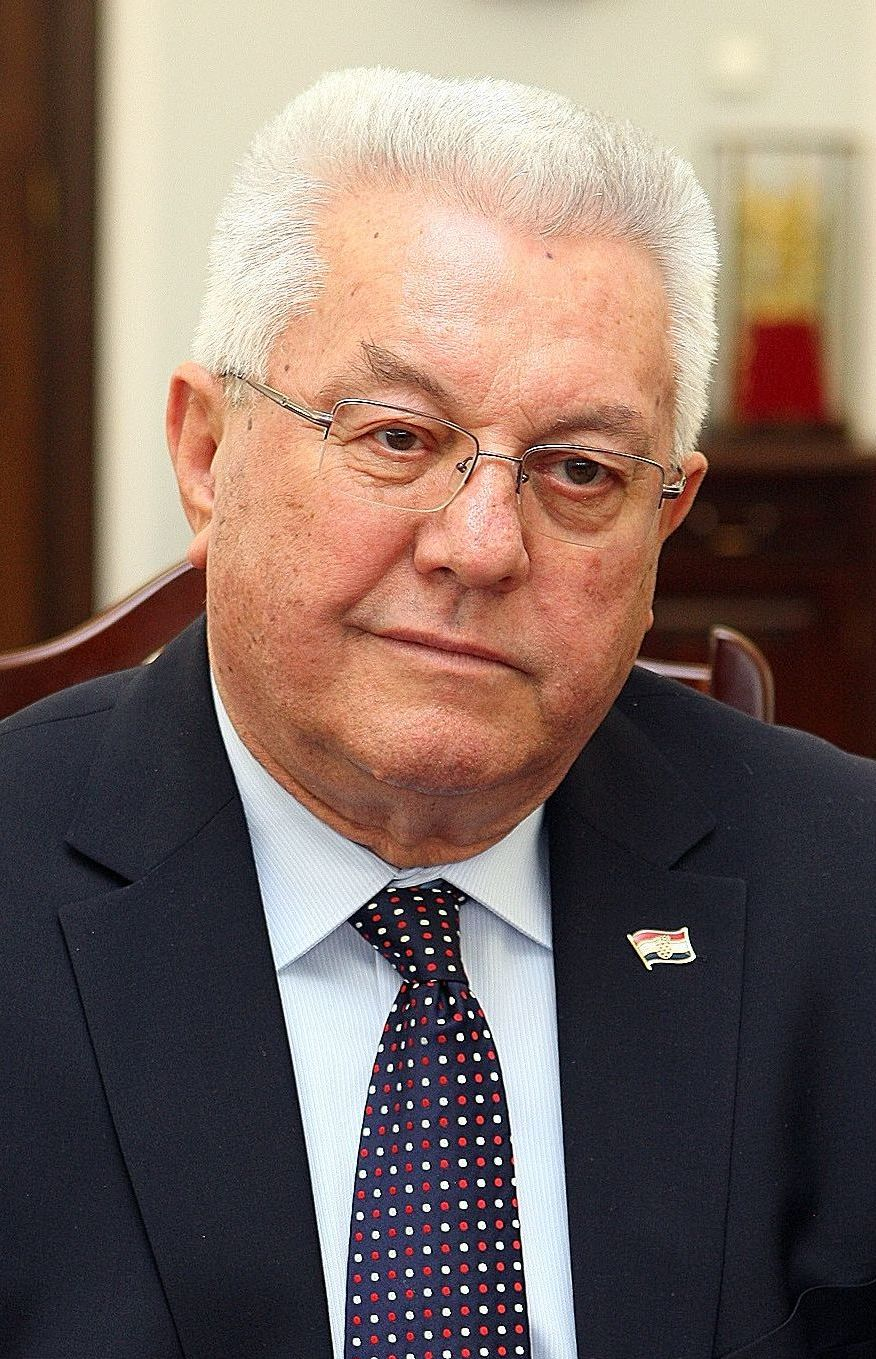

Speaker of the Croatian Parliament
- In office 11 January 2008 – 22 December 2011
- Preceded by: Vladimir Šeks
- Succeeded by: Boris Šprem

Minister of Defence
- In office 17 July 1991 – 18 September 1991
- Preceded by: Šime Đodan
- Succeeded by: Gojko Šušak

Personal details
- Born: 21 August 1937 (age 89) Desne, Kingdom of Yugoslavia (modern Croatia)
- Party: SKH (1955–1989); HDZ (1989–present)
- Education: University of Sarajevo

Luka Bebić (born 21 August 1937) is a former Croatian politician who served as Speaker of the Croatian Parliament from 11 January 2008 to 22 December 2011. He is a member of the Croatian Democratic Union (HDZ) and has been a representative in the Croatian Parliament since the nation's independence in 1991, being elected into office six consecutive times.

He graduated from the University of Sarajevo with a degree in agronomics. He also served briefly as Minister of Defence in 1991.
