= Novo Selo, Bogovinje =

Novo Selo Ново Село Novosellë
- Village
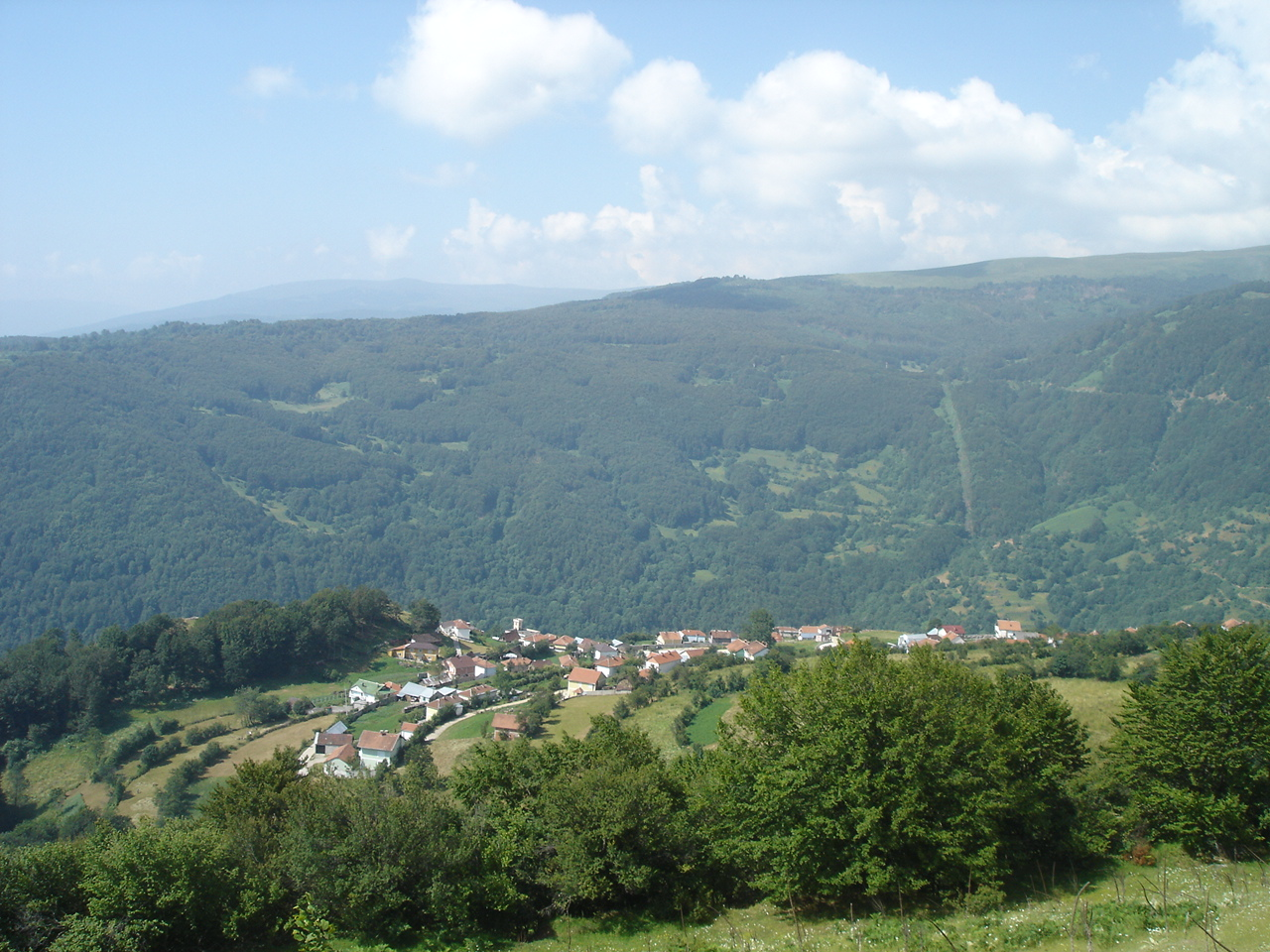
- Novo Selo

- Location within North Macedonia
- Coordinates: 41°56′43″N 20°51′45″E
- Country: North Macedonia
- Region: Polog
- Municipality: Bogovinje

Population (2021)
  - Total: 877
- Time zone: UTC+1 (CET)
  - Summer (DST): UTC+2 (CEST)
- Car plates: TE
- Website: .

Novo Selo (Macedonian: Ново Село, Albanian: Novosellë) is a village in the municipality of Bogovinje, North Macedonia. The etymology of the village comes from Slavic languages meaning new village, Novo Selo.

== Demographics ==
Novo Selo is attested in the 1467/68 Ottoman tax registry (defter) for the Nahiyah of Kalkandelen. The village had a total of 10 Christian households and 1 bachelor.

As of the 2021 census, Novo Selo had 877 residents with the following ethnic composition:

- Albanians 662
- Persons for whom data are taken from administrative sources 214
- Others 1

According to the 2002 census, the village had a total of 1,589 inhabitants. Ethnic groups in the village include:

- Albanians 1,579
- Macedonians 1
- Others 9

According to the 1942 Albanian census, Novo Selo was inhabited by 661 Muslim Albanians.
