= Novo Selo, Zelenikovo =

Novo Selo Ново Село
- Village
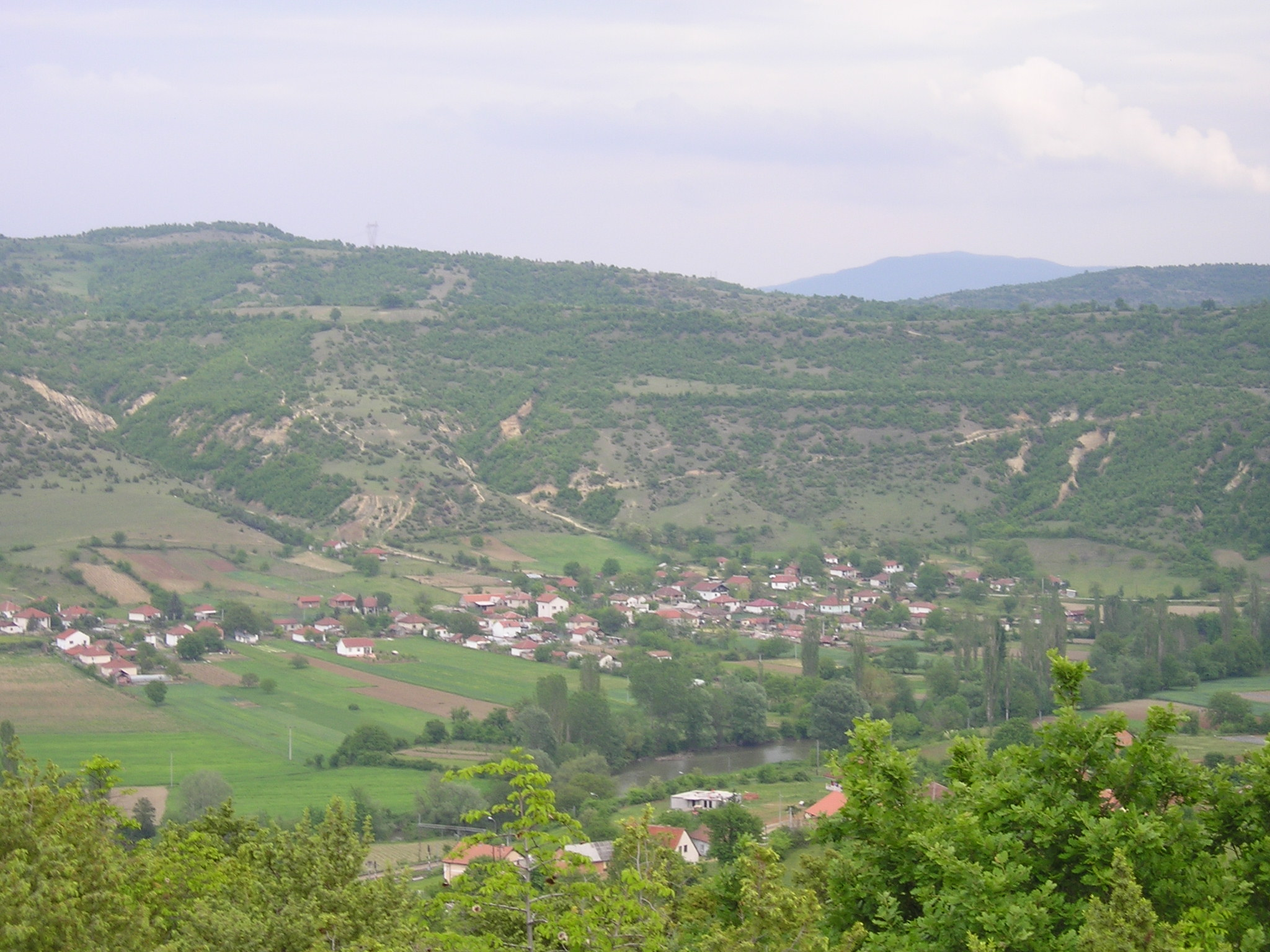

- Location within North Macedonia
- Coordinates: 41.855111°N 21.622124°E
- Country: North Macedonia
- Region: Skopje
- Municipality: Zelenikovo

Population (2002)
  - Total: 149
- Time zone: UTC+1 (CET)
  - Summer (DST): UTC+2 (CEST)
- Car plates: SK
- Website: .

Novo Selo (Macedonian: Ново Село is a village in the municipality of Zelenikovo, North Macedonia. The etymology of the village comes from Slavic languages meaning new village, Novo Selo.

== Demographics ==
According to the 2002 census, the village had a total of 149 inhabitants. Ethnic groups in the village include:

- Macedonians 144
- Serbs 5
