= Staro Selo, Jegunovce =

Staro Selo Старо Село
- Village
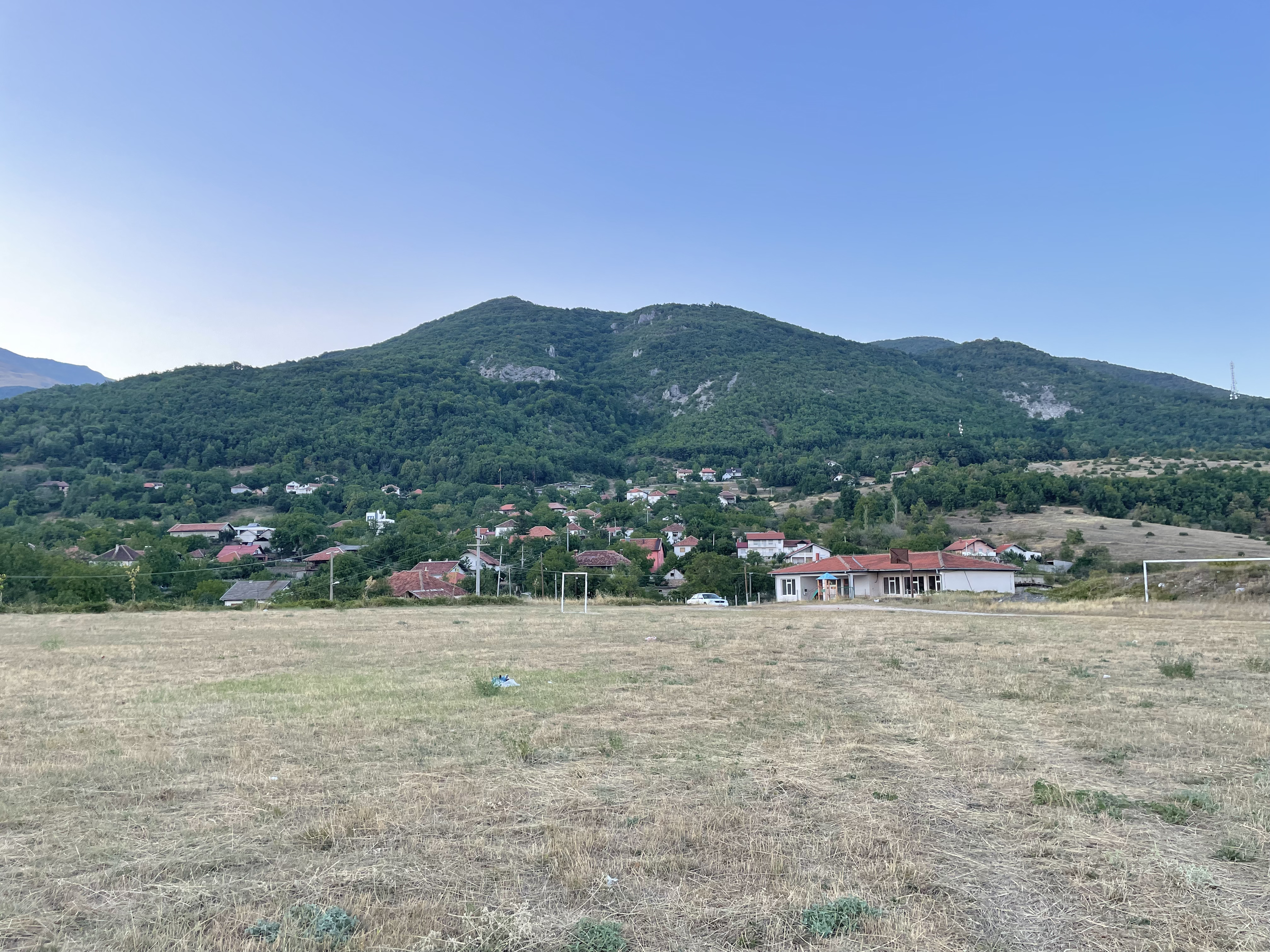

- Location within North Macedonia
- Coordinates: 42.153068°N 21.135346°E
- Country: North Macedonia
- Region: Polog
- Municipality: Jegunovce

Population (2002)
  - Total: 217
- Time zone: UTC+1 (CET)
  - Summer (DST): UTC+2 (CEST)
- Car plates: TE

Staro Selo (Macedonian: Старо Село) is a village in the municipality of Jegunovce, North Macedonia. It used to be part of the former municipality of Vratnica.

== Demographics ==
Staro Selo is attested in the 1467/68 Ottoman tax registry (defter) for the Nahiyah of Kalkandelen. The village had a total of 13 Christian households and one bachelor.

According to the 2002 census, the village had a total of 217 inhabitants. Ethnic groups in the village include:

- Macedonians 212
- Serbs 5

In statistics gathered by Vasil Kanchov in 1900, the village of Staro Selo was inhabited by 215 Christian Bulgarians.
