= Novo Selo (Velika Plana) =

Novo Selo Ново Село
- Village (Selo)
- Location within Serbia
- Coordinates: 44°15′45″N 21°05′27″E
- Country: Serbia
- District: Podunavlje District
- Municipality: Velika Plana

Population (2002)
  - Total: 1,256
- Time zone: UTC+1 (CET)
  - Summer (DST): UTC+2 (CEST)

Novo Selo is a village in the municipality of Velika Plana, Serbia. According to the 2002 census, the village has a population of 1256 people. The etymology of the village comes from Slavic languages meaning new village, Novo Selo.
