= Novo Selo, Gjorče Petrov =

Novo Selo Ново Село
- Village
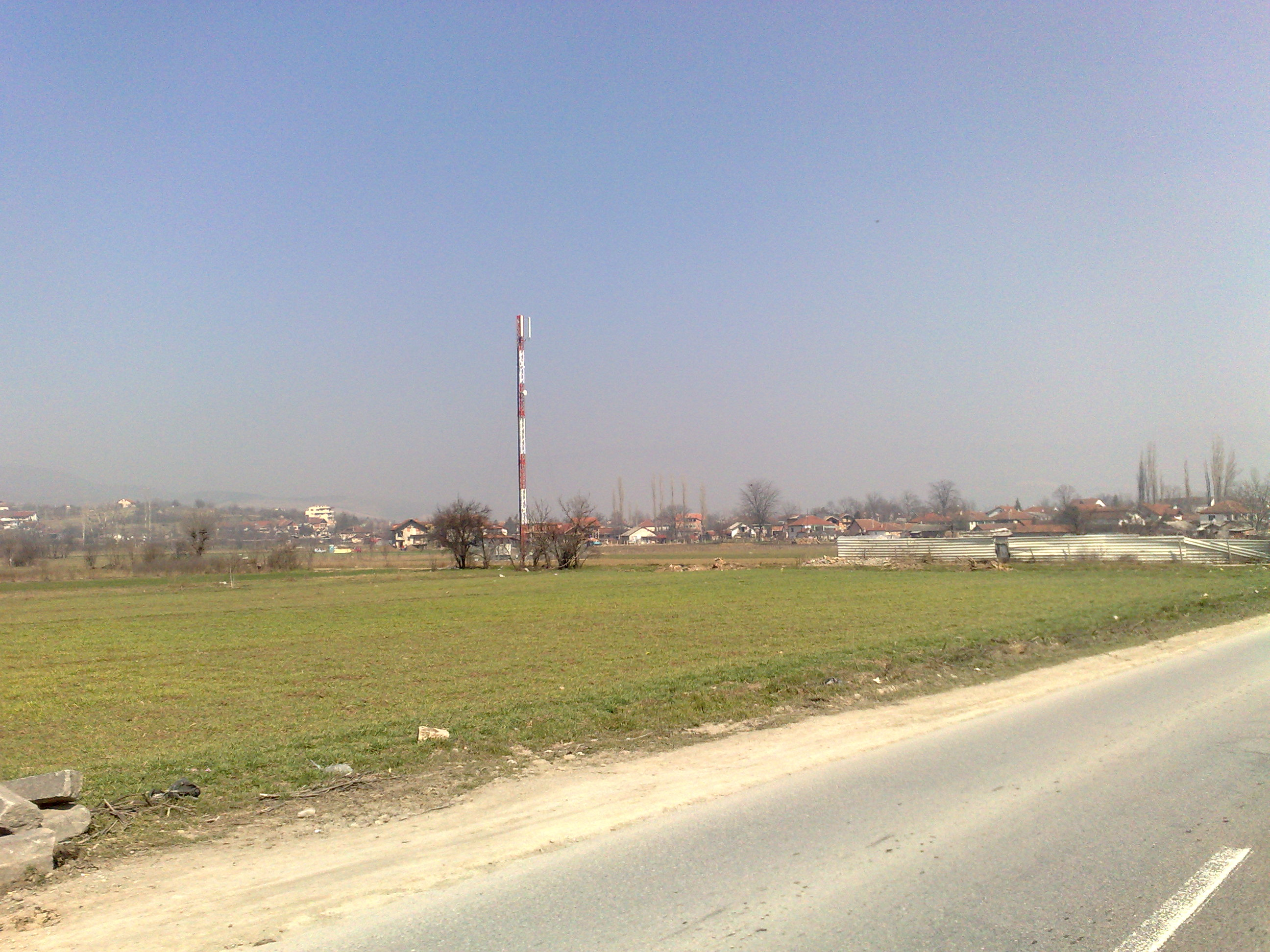

- Location within Republic of Macedonia
- Coordinates: 42°01′56″N 21°20′56″E
- Country: North Macedonia
- Region: Skopje
- Municipality: Ǵorče Petrov

Population (2002)
  - Total: 8,349
- Time zone: UTC+1 (CET)
  - Summer (DST): UTC+2 (CEST)
- Car plates: SK
- Website: .

Novo Selo (Macedonian: Ново Село) is a town in the municipality of Gjorče Petrov, North Macedonia. The etymology of the village comes from Slavic languages meaning new village, Novo Selo.

== Demographics ==
In statistics gathered by Vasil Kanchov in 1900, the village was inhabited by 300 Muslim Albanians and 208 Orthodox Bulgarians.

According to the 2002 census, the town had a total of 8349 inhabitants. Ethnic groups in the town include:

- Macedonians 7082
- Romani 869
- Serbs 274
- Turks 26
- Albanians 14
- Vlachs 14
- Bosniaks 5
- Others 68
