= Staro Selo, Glamoč =

Staro Selo
- Village
- Location within Bosnia and Herzegovina
- Coordinates: 43°58′16″N 16°56′15″E
- Country: Bosnia and Herzegovina
- Entity: Federation of Bosnia and Herzegovina
- Canton: Canton 10
- Municipality: Glamoč

Area
  - Total: 7.47 km^{2} (2.88 sq mi)

Population (2013)
  - Total: 1
  - Density: 0.13/km^{2} (0.35/sq mi)
- Time zone: UTC+1 (CET)
  - Summer (DST): UTC+2 (CEST)

Staro Selo is a village in the Municipality of Glamoč in Canton 10 of the Federation of Bosnia and Herzegovina, an entity of Bosnia and Herzegovina.

== Demographics ==
According to the 2013 census, its population was just 1, a Serb.

== Bibliography ==
- Ethnicity/National Affiliation, Religion and Mother Tongue (PDF). Sarajevo: Agency for Statistics of Bosnia and Herzegovina. 2019.
