= Novo Selo, Želino =

Novo Selo Ново Село Novosellë
- Village
- Location within North Macedonia
- Coordinates: 41°57′50″N 21°09′32″E
- Country: North Macedonia
- Region: Polog
- Municipality: Želino

Population (2021)
  - Total: 602
- Time zone: UTC+1 (CET)
  - Summer (DST): UTC+2 (CEST)
- Car plates: TE
- Website: .

Novo Selo (Macedonian: Ново Село, Albanian: Novosellë) is a village in the municipality of Želino, North Macedonia. The etymology of the village comes from Slavic languages meaning new village, Novo Selo.

== Demographics ==
Novo Selo is attested in the 1467/68 Ottoman tax registry (defter) for the Nahiyah of Kalkandelen. The village had a total of 6 Christian households and 1 widow.

As of the 2021 census, Novo Selo had 602 residents with the following ethnic composition:

- Albanians 542
- Persons for whom data are taken from administrative sources 60

According to the 2002 census, the village had a total of 667 inhabitants. Ethnic groups in the village include:

- Albanians 663
- Bosniaks 1
- Others 3
