= Staro Selo (Prokuplje) =

Staro Selo Старо Село (Serbian)
- Village
- Location within Serbia
- Coordinates: 43°05′33.05″N 21°32′37.31″E
- Country: Serbia
- District: Toplica District
- Municipality: Prokuplje

Population (2002)
  - Total: 29
- Time zone: UTC+1 (CET)
  - Summer (DST): UTC+2 (CEST)

Staro Selo is a village in the municipality of Prokuplje, Serbia. According to the 2002 census, the village has a population of 29 people.
