= Novo Selo, Sokolac =

Novo Selo
- Village
- Location within Bosnia and Herzegovina
- Coordinates: 43°57′33″N 18°46′56″E
- Country: Bosnia and Herzegovina
- Entity: Republika Srpska
- Municipality: Sokolac
- Time zone: UTC+1 (CET)
  - Summer (DST): UTC+2 (CEST)

Novo Selo (Serbian: Ново Село) is a village in the municipality of Sokolac, Bosnia and Herzegovina. The etymology of the village comes from Slavic languages meaning new village, Novo Selo.
