= Đurđenovac =

- Municipality
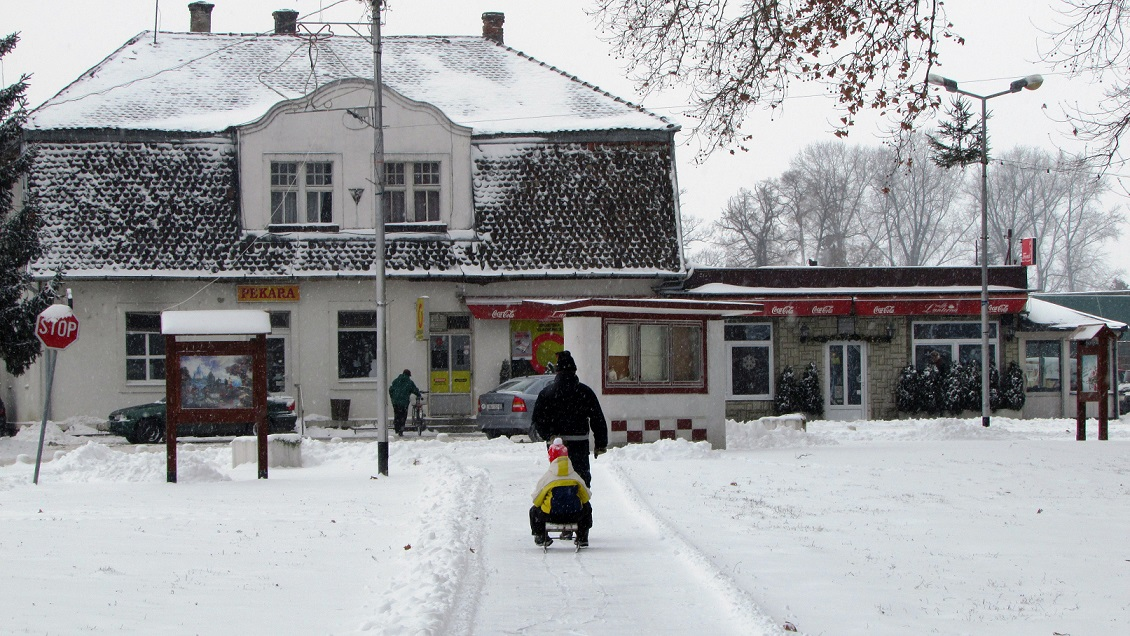

- Location of Đurđenovac in Croatia Đurđenovac (Croatia)
- Coordinates: 45.54°N 18.05°E
- Country: Croatia
- Region: Slavonia
- County: Osijek-Baranja County

Government
  - Mayor: Hrvoje Topalović

Area
  - Municipality: 116.4 km^{2} (44.9 sq mi)
  - Urban: 7.2 km^{2} (2.8 sq mi)

Population (2021)
  - Municipality: 5,332
  - Density: 45.81/km^{2} (118.6/sq mi)
  - Urban: 2,318
  - Urban density: 320/km^{2} (830/sq mi)
- Time zone: UTC+1 (Central European Time)
- Website: djurdjenovac.hr

Đurđenovac (Hungarian: Gyurgyenovác) is a municipality in Slavonia, in the Osijek-Baranja County of Croatia.

At the 2011 census, there were a total of 6,750 inhabitants in the entire municipality, in the following settlements:

- Beljevina, population 712
- Bokšić, population 433
- Bokšić Lug, population 259
- Đurđenovac, population 2,944
- Gabrilovac, population 63
- Klokočevci, population 428
- Krčevina, population 115
- Ličko Novo Selo, population 96
- Lipine, population 68
- Našičko Novo Selo, population 344
- Pribiševci, population 390
- Sušine, population 278
- Šaptinovci, population 543
- Teodorovac, population 77

By ethnicity, 96.6% of the population was Croat, while 1.9% was Serb.

The colonial settlement of Ličko Novo Selo was established during the land reform in interwar Yugoslavia.

== History ==
The second known electric generator in Croatia was installed in Đurđenovac in 1881, just one year after the first was introduced in Duga Resa.
