= Novo Selo (Lebane) =

Novo Selo Ново Село (Serbian)
- Village
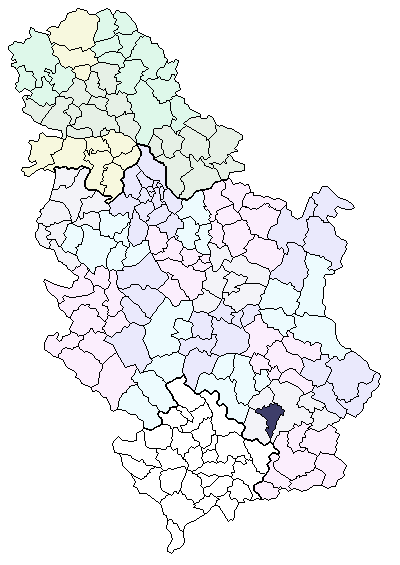
- Location of the municipality of Lebane in Serbia

- Location within Serbia
- Coordinates: 42.9591356°N 21.6859172°E
- Country: Serbia
- District: Jablanica District
- Municipality: Lebane

Population (2002)
  - Total: 207
- Time zone: UTC+1 (CET)
  - Summer (DST): UTC+2 (CEST)

Novo Selo is a village in the municipality of Lebane, Serbia. According to the 2002 census, the village has a population of 207 people.
