= Momići =

- Village
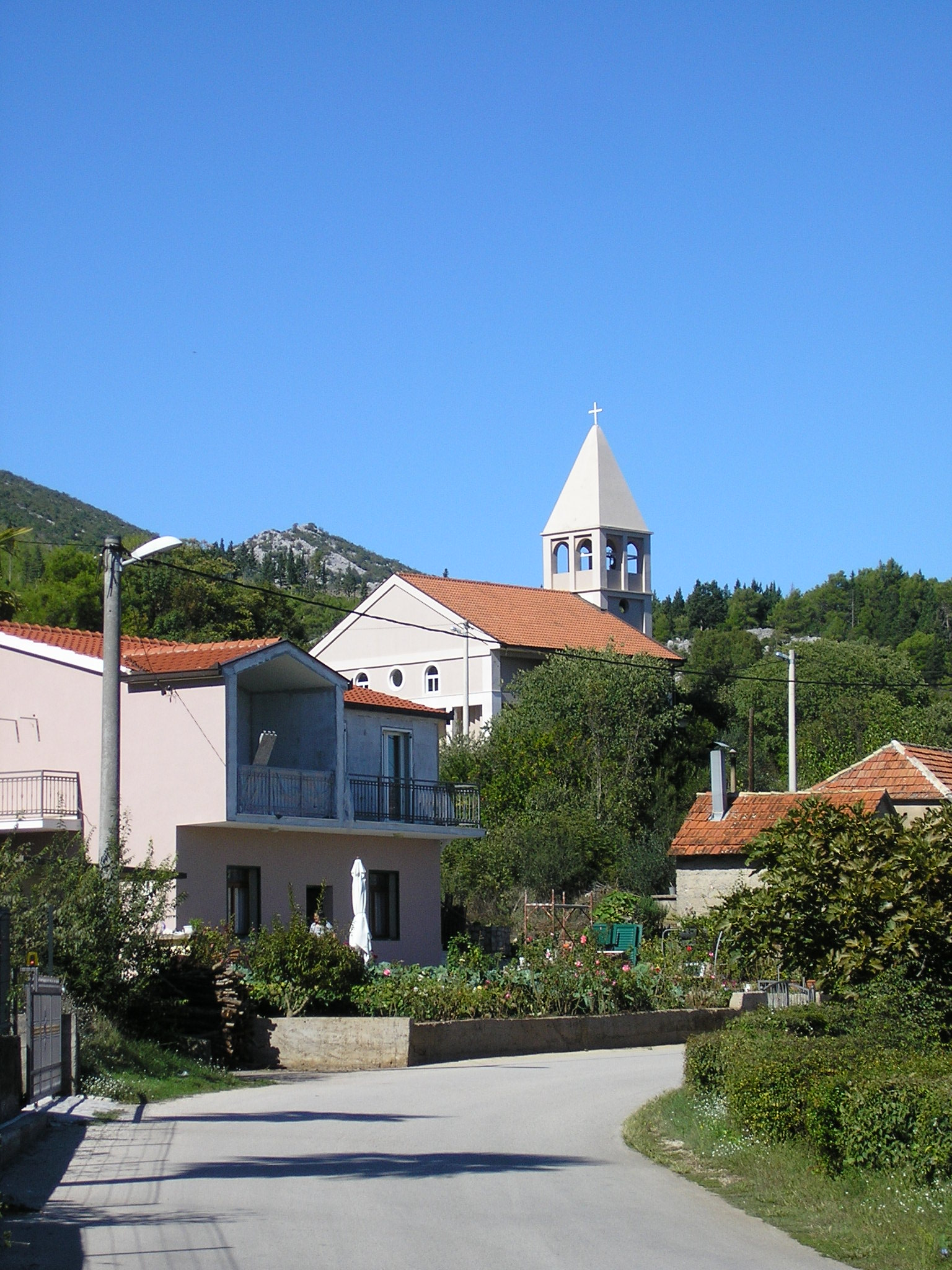

- Location of Momići in Croatia
- Coordinates: 43°02′49″N 17°35′24″E
- Country: Croatia
- County: Dubrovnik–Neretva
- Municipality: Kula Norinska

Area
  - Total: 4.3 km^{2} (1.7 sq mi)

Population (2021)
  - Total: 163
  - Density: 38/km^{2} (98/sq mi)
- Time zone: UTC+1 (CET)
  - Summer (DST): UTC+2 (CEST)

Momići is a village in the Kula Norinska municipality.

== Demographics ==
Historical population
Year	Pop.	±%
1880	147	—
1890	153	+4.1%
1900	165	+7.8%
1910	173	+4.8%
1948	211	+22.0%
1953	235	+11.4%
1961	240	+2.1%
1971	263	+9.6%
1981	207	−21.3%
1991	245	+18.4%
2001	215	−12.2%
2011	205	−4.7%
2021	161	−21.5%
Source: Census

== Church of Our Lady of Fatima ==
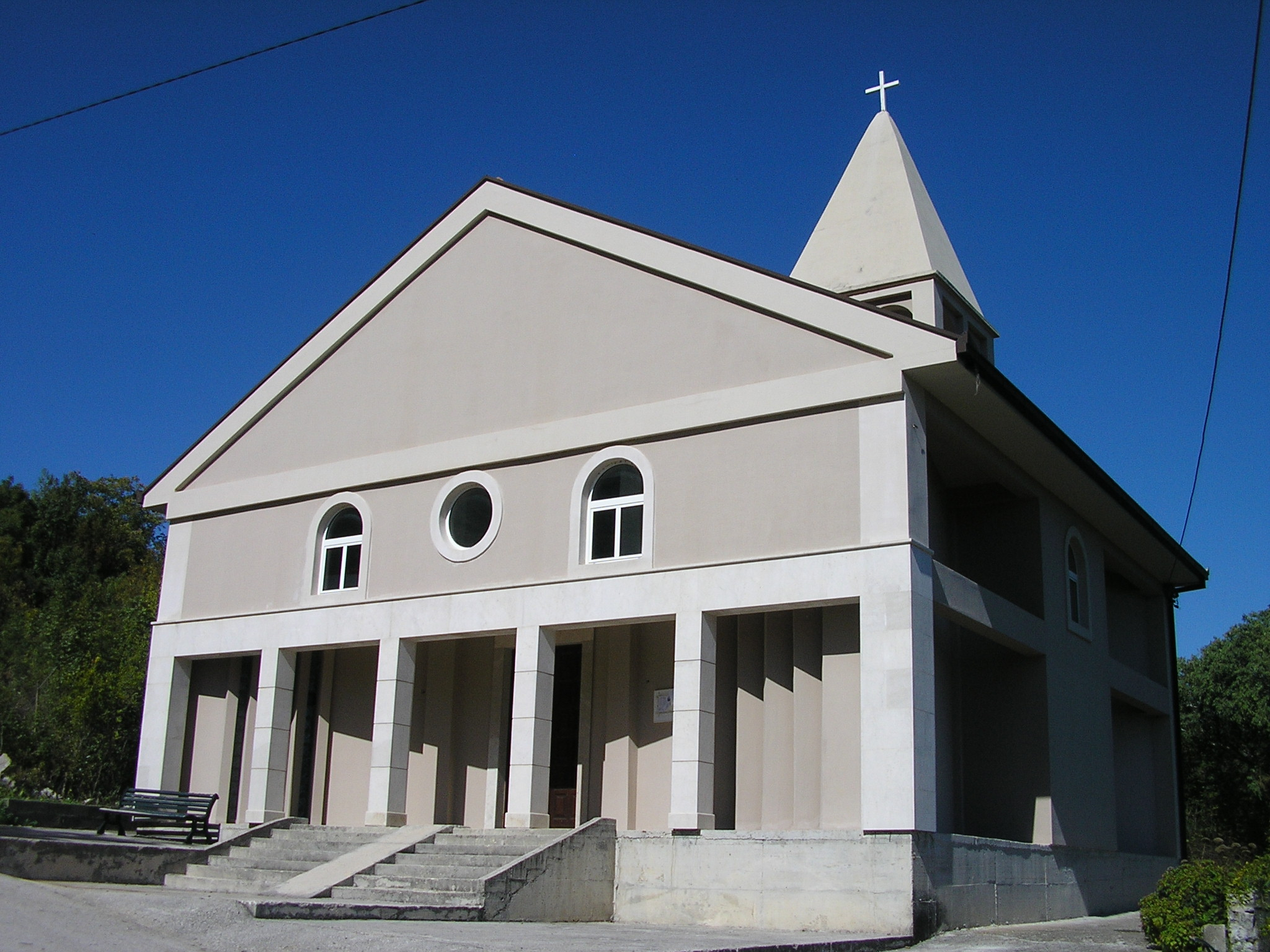
Church of the Lady of Fatima

The 12x12 metre church started construction in 1973 during the time of pastor Špirko Vuković, and it was completed in 1982 during the time of pastor Joza Varvodić. It was blessed by bishop Marko Perić on the holiday of Our Lady of Fatima, on 13 May. Above the altar is the painting Igra križa, sunca i zvijezda(The play of the cross, Sun and stars) by pastor Ivan Marijan Čagalj. When Stjepan Barišić was pastor, in 1995, a belfry was built. She is the patron of Momići.

== Culture ==
On 7 May 1939 a Croatian reference library was opened by the leader of HSS in Metković, dr. Niko Bjelovučić. It stopped working during the Second World War, and its inventory has been lost.

The cultural society Škrapa has been annually organising the Toćijada since 2015, a competition in cooking toć, a kind of thick, meaty sauce.

The village has an elementary school, and is planning to use its lower floor as a kindergarten.
