= Stara Sela =

Stara Sela Selo (until 1952)
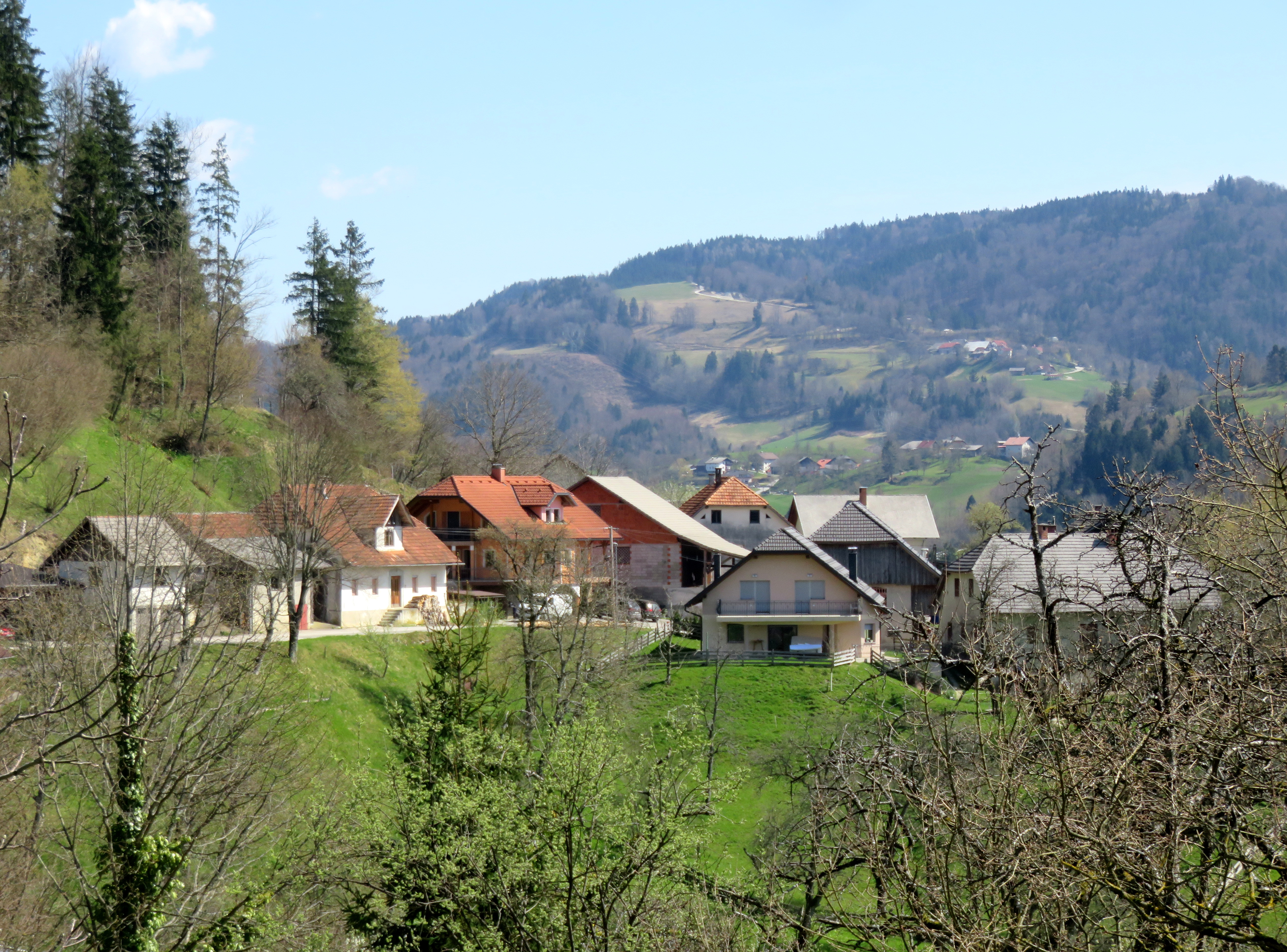

- Location in Slovenia
- Coordinates: 46°13′33.03″N 14°45′8.16″E
- Country: Slovenia
- Traditional region: Upper Carniola
- Statistical region: Central Slovenia
- Municipality: Kamnik

Area
  - Total: 2.53 km^{2} (0.98 sq mi)
- Elevation: 580 m (1,900 ft)

Population (2002)
  - Total: 49

Stara Sela (pronounced [ˈstaːɾa ˈseːla]; Slovene: Stara sela) is a small village in the Tuhinj Valley in the Municipality of Kamnik in the Upper Carniola region of Slovenia.

== Name ==
The name of the settlement was changed from Selo to Stara sela in 1952.

== See also ==
- Nova Sela (disambiguation)
