= Borovci, Kula Norinska =

Borovci
- Village
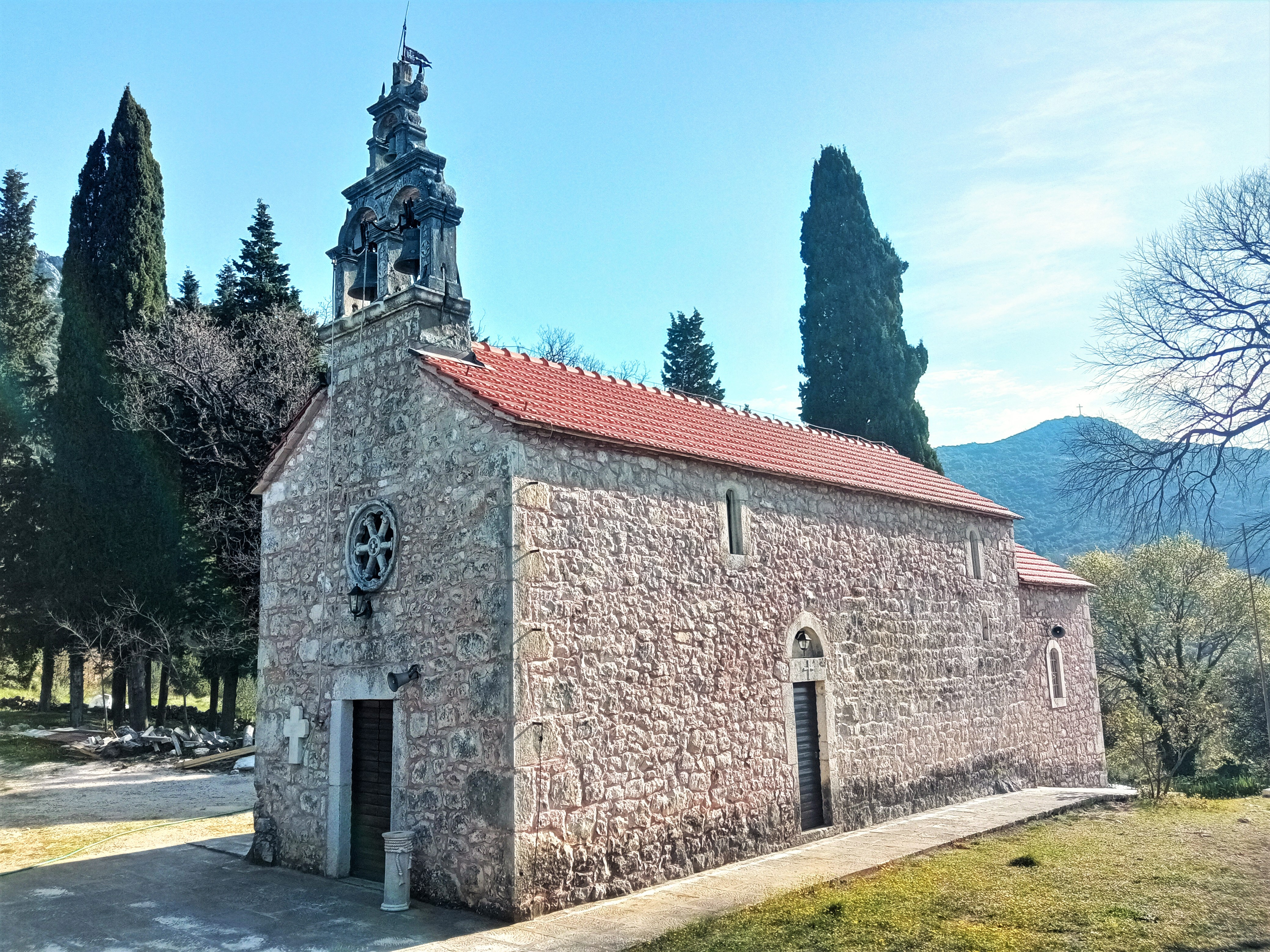
- Church of st. Nicholas

- Location within Croatia
- Coordinates: 43°05′42″N 17°32′20″E
- Country: Croatia
- County: Dubrovnik-Neretva County
- Municipality: Kula Norinska

Area
  - Total: 13.9 km^{2} (5.4 sq mi)
- Elevation: 50 m (160 ft)

Population (2021)
  - Total: 30
  - Density: 2.2/km^{2} (5.6/sq mi)

Borovci is a village near Metković in the Kula Norinska municipality with a population of 29 (2021 census).

== Geography ==
Borovci is in a 4 km (2.5 mi) long and 1.5 km (0.93 mi)–2 km (1.2 mi) wide polje that lies in a northwestern-southeasterly direction. The altitude is 50 m (160 ft). The polje has little arable land. It is surrounded by hills, Tikvina and Gradina from the northeast, and Rujnica from the southeast.

== Archaeology and architecture ==
=== Stećci ===
There is a medieval necropolis with stećci in Zanoga, southeast of Borovci. 44 stone blocks are north and west of the stone pile. There are mostly undecorated coffins. A necropolis is also in Mravnici, near Zanoga. They are decorated with the star and crescent.

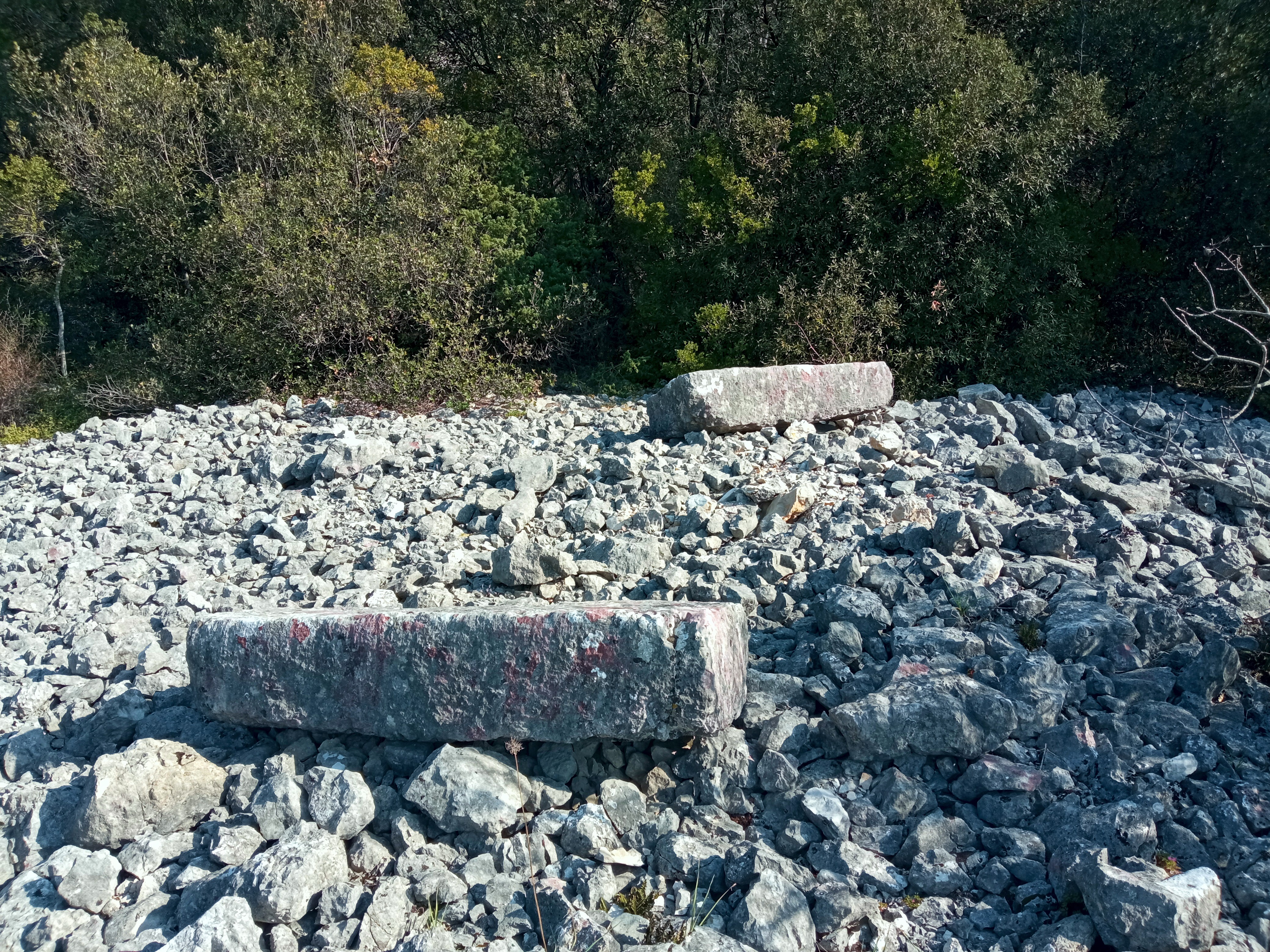
Stećci in Zanoga

=== Medieval Vratar fort ===
Near today's village of Vratar is a five-sided medieval fort with two towers, on Gradina, at an altitude of 97 metres (318 ft). It was built in the 15th century and is a cultural good of the Republic of Croatia.

=== Parish Church of st. Nicholas ===
The parish church was first mentioned by the bishop Lišnjić in 1672 when he said that the church is "complete, but poorly equipped". The church was built in two phases. During works on the church in 1997 remains of the first phase's wallsm built in a romanesque style, were found. Experts think it was originally built in the 13th century. In 1779 bishop Fabijan Blašković ordered the church to be expanded to meet the needs of the increasing number of inhabitants. The expansion only happened in 1858 during the time of pastor Marko Marušić. The belfry was built in 1865 and the roof was tiled in the beginning of the 20th century.

=== Chapel of Our Lady of Health ===
The chapel is near the parish. The chapel was originally built in 1759 and was named the Chapel of st. Anthony of Padua. With the monetary help of Croatian Americans from Borovci, monk Mijo Ivandić expanded the chapel and dedicated it to the Virgin Mary. He changed the dedication because there had already been a church of st. Ante in Nova Sela.

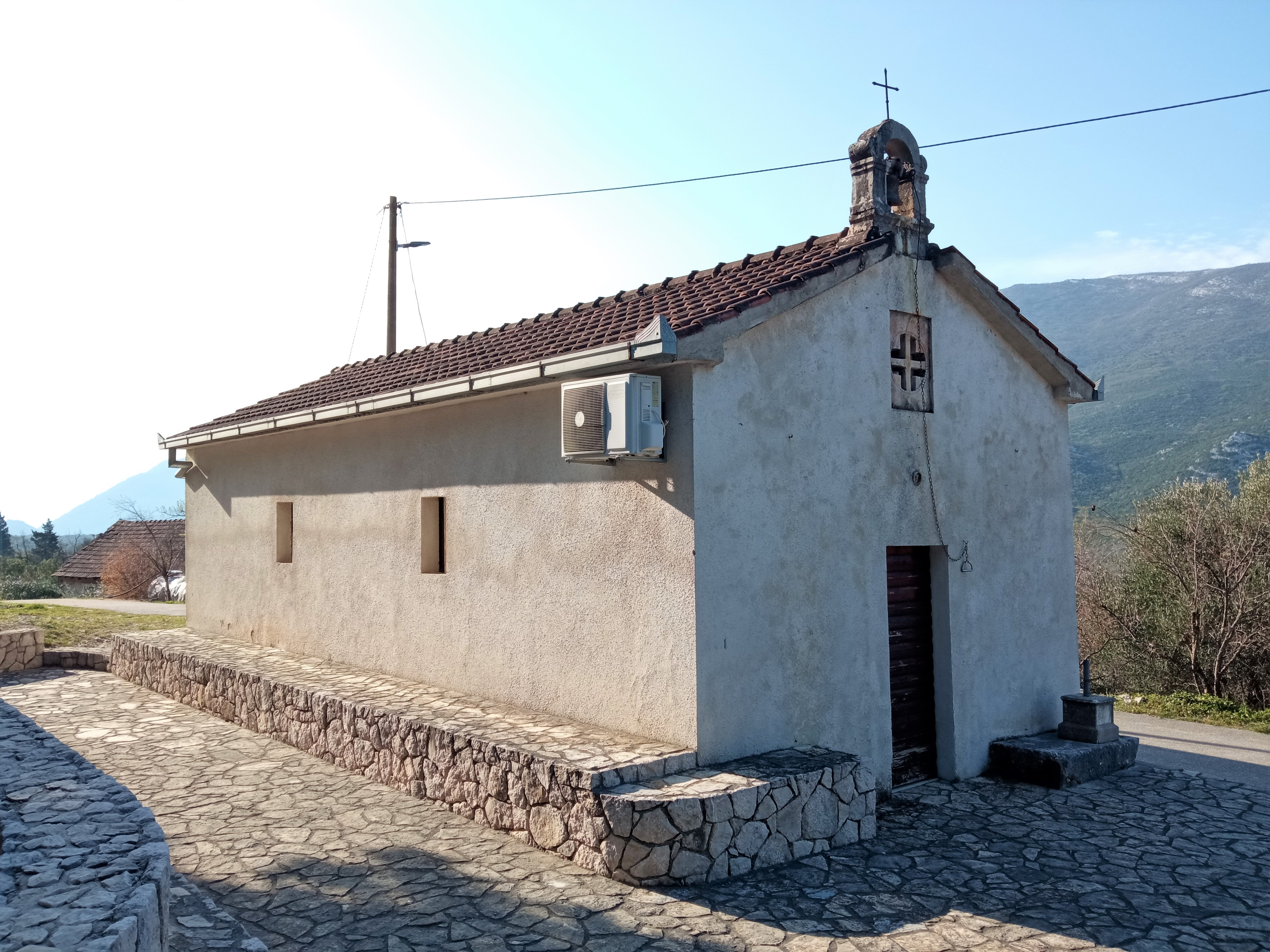
Chapel of Our Lady of Health

== Demographics ==
According to the 2021 census, its population was 30.

Historical population
| Year | Pop. | ±% |
|---|---|---|
| 1857 | 598 | — |
| 1869 | 719 | +20.2% |
| 1880 | 409 | −43.1% |
| 1890 | 429 | +4.9% |
| 1900 | 537 | +25.2% |
| 1910 | 539 | +0.4% |
| 1921 | 533 | −1.1% |
| 1931 | 530 | −0.6% |
| 1948 | 456 | −14.0% |
| 1953 | 423 | −7.2% |
| 1961 | 364 | −13.9% |
| 1971 | 207 | −43.1% |
| 1981 | 79 | −61.8% |
| 1991 | 45 | −43.0% |
| 2001 | 33 | −26.7% |
| 2011 | 23 | −30.3% |
| 2021 | 29 | +26.1% |
Source: Census

== Education ==
The first public school in Borovci was established on 1 October 1896. 70 pupils enrolled in it and the opening was celebrated. The school operated until 31 August 1968, except in wartime. It closed down because of the decreased number of children. Pupils from Borovci have since attended the school in Nova Sela.
