= Novoselci =

Novoselci may refer to:

- Novoselci, Bosnia and Herzegovina, a village near Dubica, Bosnia and Herzegovina
- Novoselci, Požega-Slavonia County, a village near Pleternica, Croatia
- Novoselci, Sisak-Moslavina County, a village near Sunja, Croatia
