= Desne =

- Village
- Facing northeast, overlooking the residences of Desne's small population

- Location of Desne in Croatia
- Coordinates: 43°3′N 17°31′E
- Country: Croatia
- County: Dubrovnik-Neretva
- Municipality: Kula Norinska

Area
  - Total: 15.2 km^{2} (5.9 sq mi)

Population (2021)
  - Total: 111
  - Density: 7.30/km^{2} (18.9/sq mi)
- Time zone: UTC+1 (CET)
  - Summer (DST): UTC+2 (CEST)
- Postal code: 20341 Kula Norinska
- Area code: +385 (020)

Desne is one of nine villages of the Municipality of Kula Norinska, in the Dubrovnik-Neretva County, on Croatia's Dalmatian coast.

Former speaker of the Croatian Parliament Luka Bebić and the well-known Croatian-American winemaker Mike Grgich were born in Desne.

== Architecture ==
=== Parish church of Saint George ===
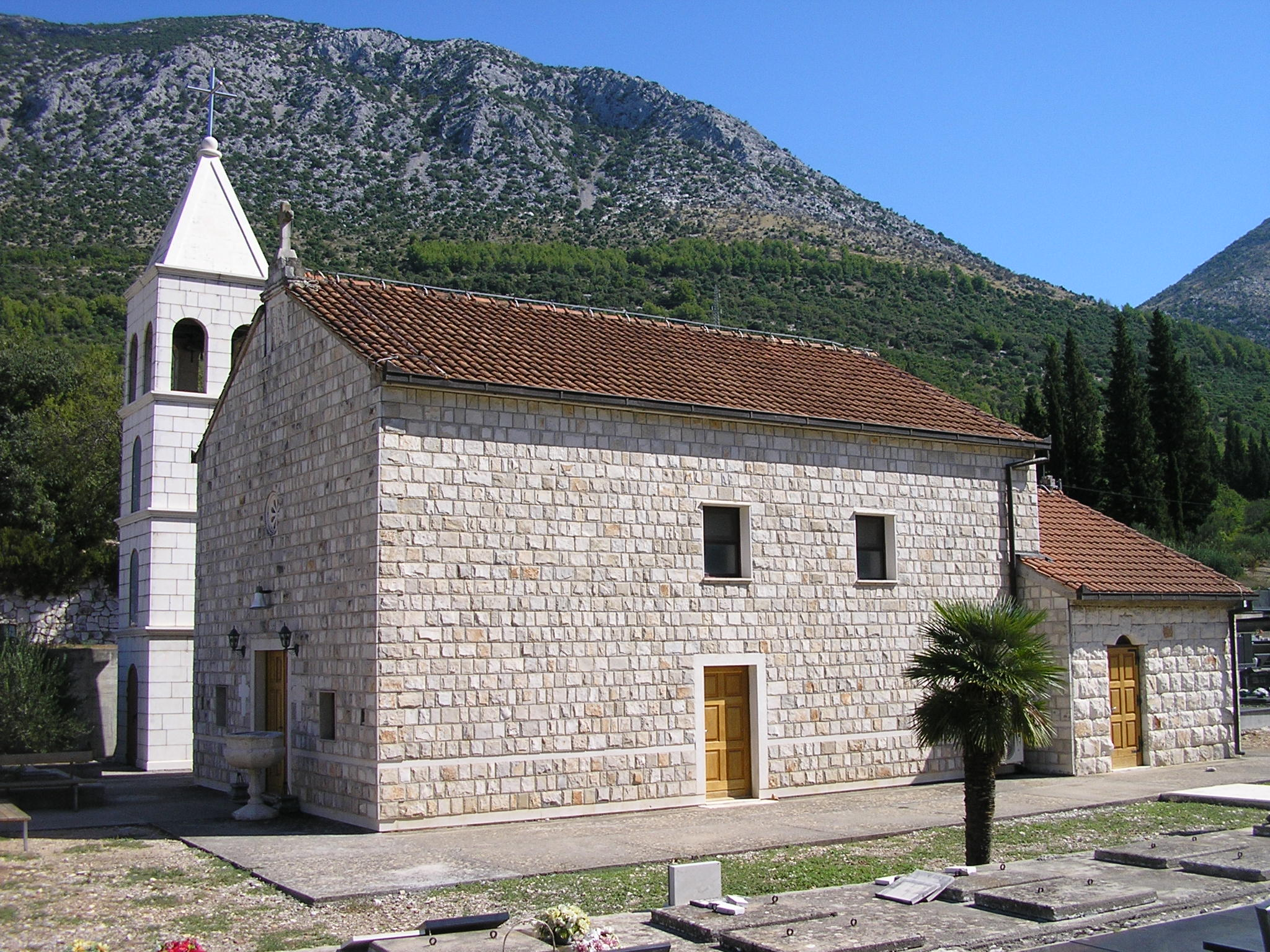
The Church of Saint George

The church was built in the late 17th or early 18th century, after the Ottomans lost the village. It was too small to accommodate all the denizens, so the Makarska bishop Fabijan Blašković in 1779 ordered a chapel of the same size to be built. This didn't happen, and the church started deteriorating and became dangerous for entrants. In 1837, service was banned until it was fixed. It was repaired in 1845 and expanded to 16.5x8 metres. The belfry was built after World War I. A renovation happened in 1990 when Dušan Brečić was pastor. Afterwards, archbishop Ante Jurić consecrated the church on the holiday of Saint Liborius on 23 July 1991.

=== Chapel of Saint Nicholas ===
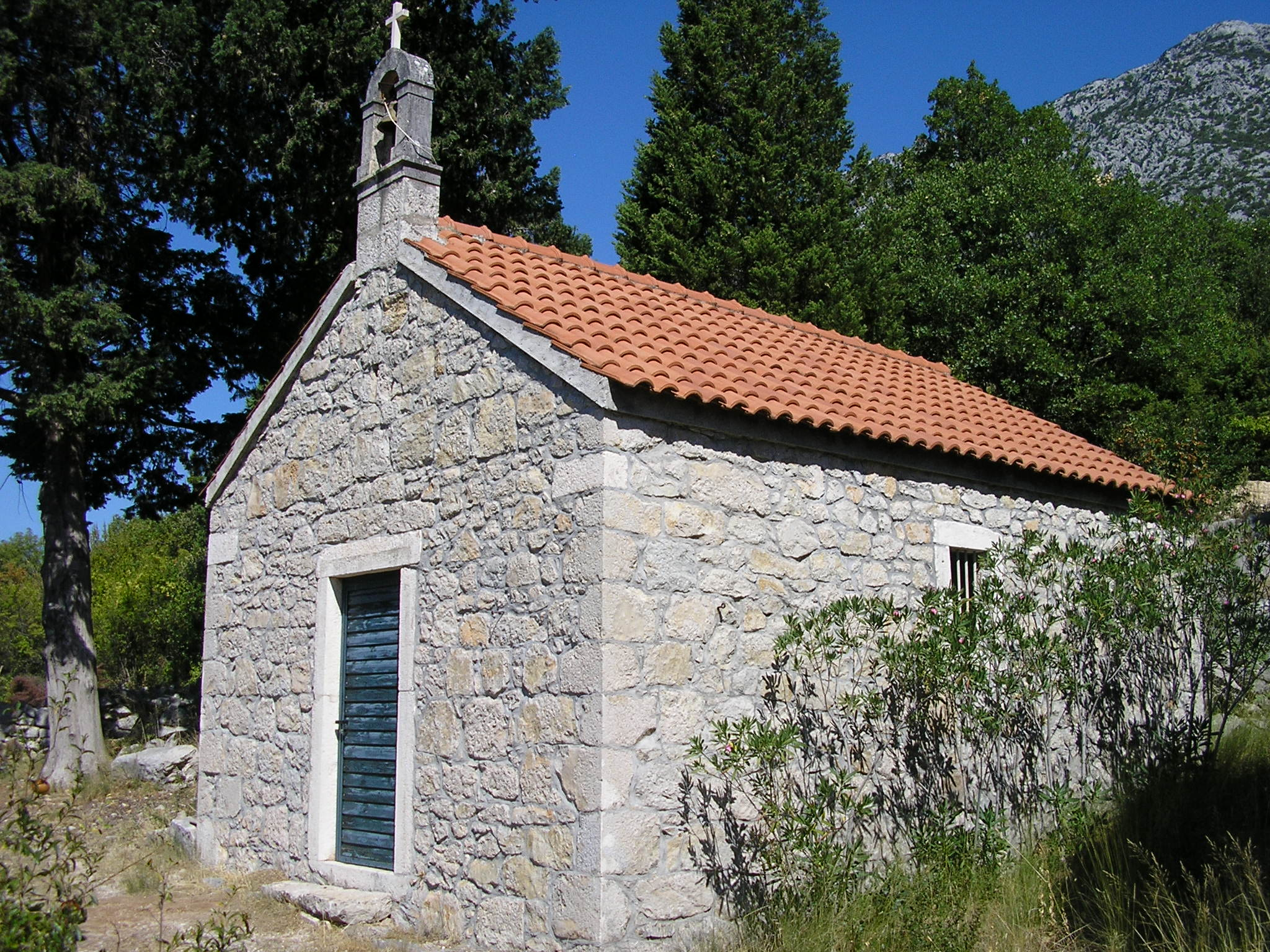
The Chapel of Saint Nicholas

The 6.7x5.3 metre chapel was built after the foundation of the parish in 1921, next to the parish house, in the part of the village called Kod Kuća.

=== Chapel of Saint Roch on Rujnica ===
The earliest mention of this 9.15x4 metre chapel is in 1761 when a baptism was recorded. The pastor settled on the mountain Rujnica that year. The village in which the chapel has been was abandoned by 1910. Today, mass is held there only on the holiday of Saint Roch, the third day of Easter, and the third day of Pentecost. The descendants of the former populace then congregate. The chapel's roof was renovated which saved it from further deterioration.

=== Nearby chapels ===
There are two small chapels, both dedicated to the Virgin Mary, near the village. The first is in the hamlet Medaca, and the second is in the hamlet Bebići.

== Demographics ==
Historical population
Year	Pop.	±%
1857	1,056	—
1869	1,257	+19.0%
1880	744	−40.8%
1890	831	+11.7%
1900	972	+17.0%
1910	1,163	+19.7%
1921	726	−37.6%
1931	753	+3.7%
1948	627	−16.7%
1953	593	−5.4%
1961	499	−15.9%
1971	298	−40.3%
1981	222	−25.5%
1991	197	−11.3%
2001	130	−34.0%
2011	90	−30.8%
2021	111	+23.3%
Source: Census
