= Trams in Zagreb =

Public transport system in Zagreb, Croatia

Zagreb tramway network

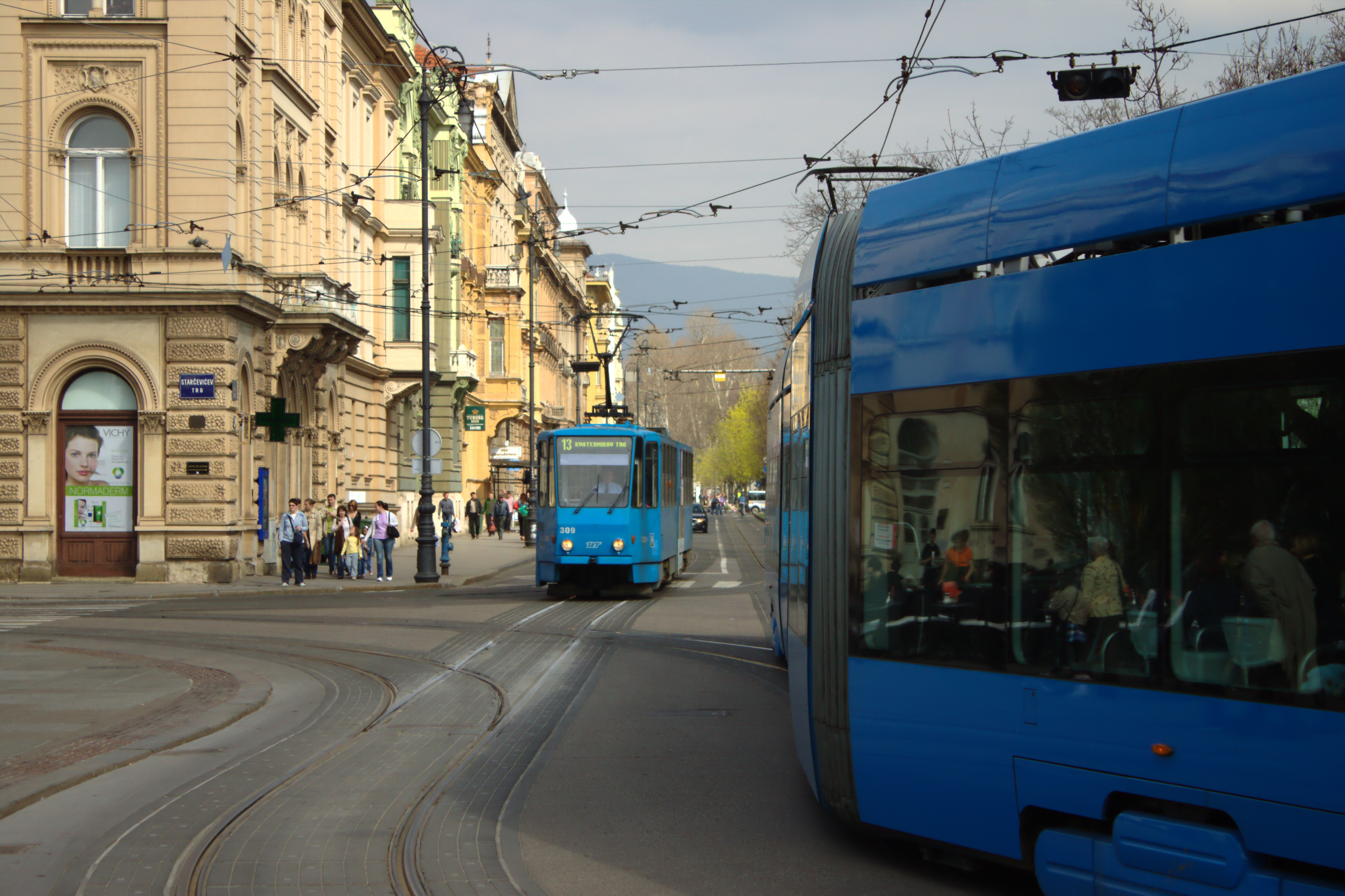
- TMK 2200 and Tatra KT4 trams at Glavni Kolodvor

Overview
- Locale: Zagreb, Croatia
- Transit type: Tramway, Light rail transit (LRT)
- Number of lines: 19 (15 daytime, 4 nighttime)
- Number of stations: 256
- Daily ridership: 333,773
- Annual ridership: 121,827,000 (2024)

Operation
- Began operation: 1891 (horsecar); 1910 (electric tram)
- Operator: Zagreb Electric Tram

Technical
- System length: 116.35 km (72.30 mi)
- Track gauge: 1,000 mm (3 ft 3 3/8 in) metre gauge
- Electrification: 600 V DC
System map

The Zagreb tram network, run by the Zagreb Electric Tram (ZET), consists of 15 day and 4 night lines in Zagreb, Croatia. Trams operate on 116.3 kilometres (72.3 mi) of metre gauge route. During the day, every line runs on average every 5–10 minutes, and almost every station serves at least two routes. Nighttime lines have exact timetables averaging at about every 40 minutes. The first horsecar tram line was opened in 1891, and the first electric one in 1910.

== History ==
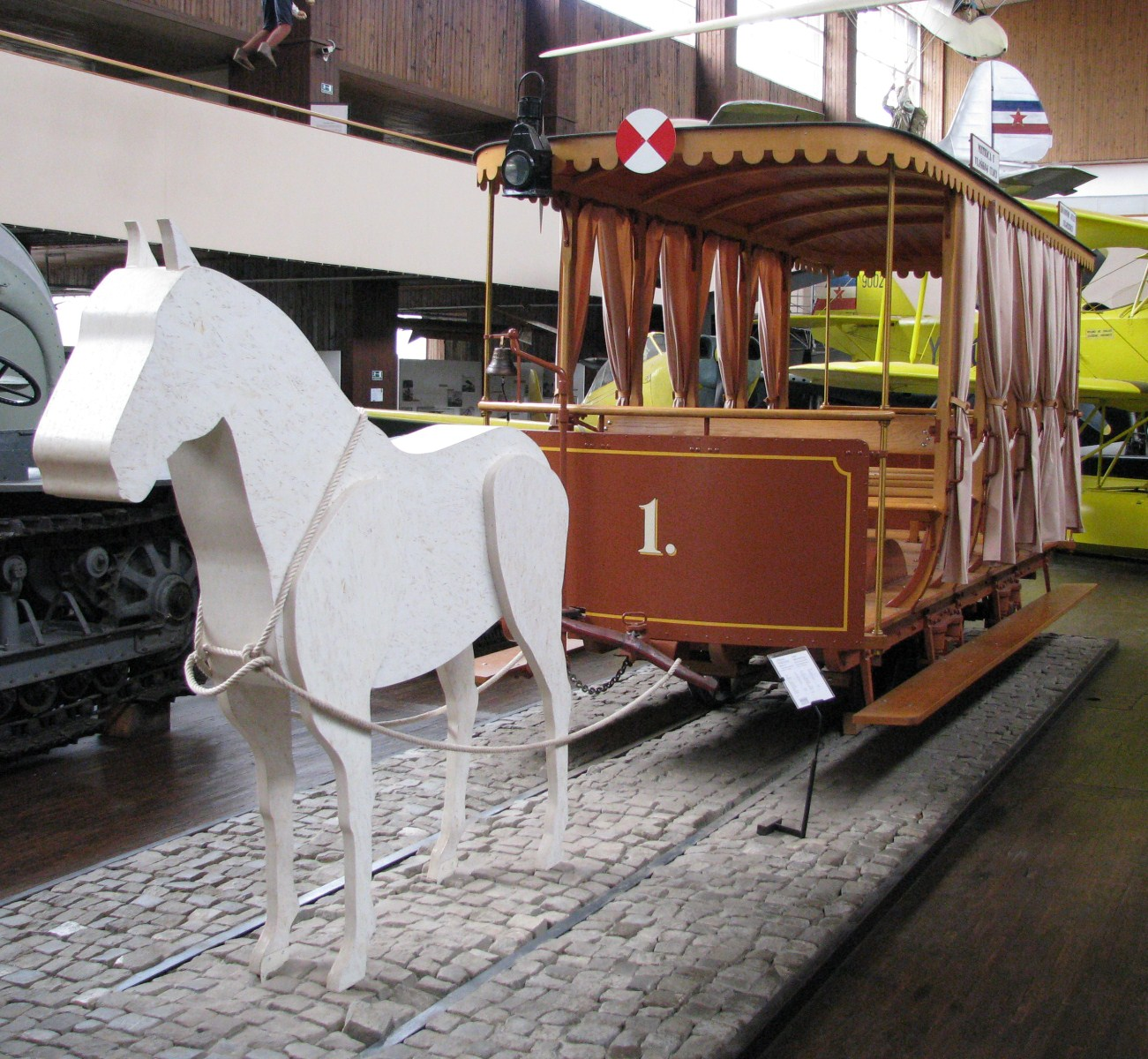
Horsecar replicas at the Technical Museum in Zagreb

At the end of the 19th century, rapid urbanisation took place in Zagreb. As many European cities already had a tram network, Zagreb city officials started discussing the idea of installing a horsecar system as well. Zagreb newspaper Bič satirically wrote in 1885 “Trams have been introduced, but, of course, in Vienna, Graz and Budapest.” The construction of the tracks began in 1889. Trams should have been put in service on 15 August 1891, on the opening day of the Jubilee Economic-Forestry Exhibition. Due to vehicle delivery delay, however, the tram was instead put in service on 5 September 1891, with a ticket costing 6 Hellers. That day was officially taken as the beginning of an organised public transit system in Zagreb. Initially, there were 16 horse-drawn trams on the streets - 10 closed and 6 open-air units. These were made by the Graz factory, owned by the Austrian businessman Johann Weitzer. In 1910, by the time the horse-drawn trams started being phased out because of the electrification of the network, the rolling stock had risen up to 17 closed and 15 open-air units. The system was built on a 760 mm gauge (narrow gauge), and the track length was approximately 8 km (5.0 mi). What is now the Nikola Tesla Technical Museum was previously the location of the first tram depot in Zagreb, opened in 1891 on Savska street. The first tram tracks spanned from Eugen Kvaternik Square to Mandaličina Street, branching off to West Railway Station and Sava Bridge. In the first year of operation, the network transported more than a million people, despite Zagreb having a population of only around 40,000.

Evolution of the Zagreb tram network

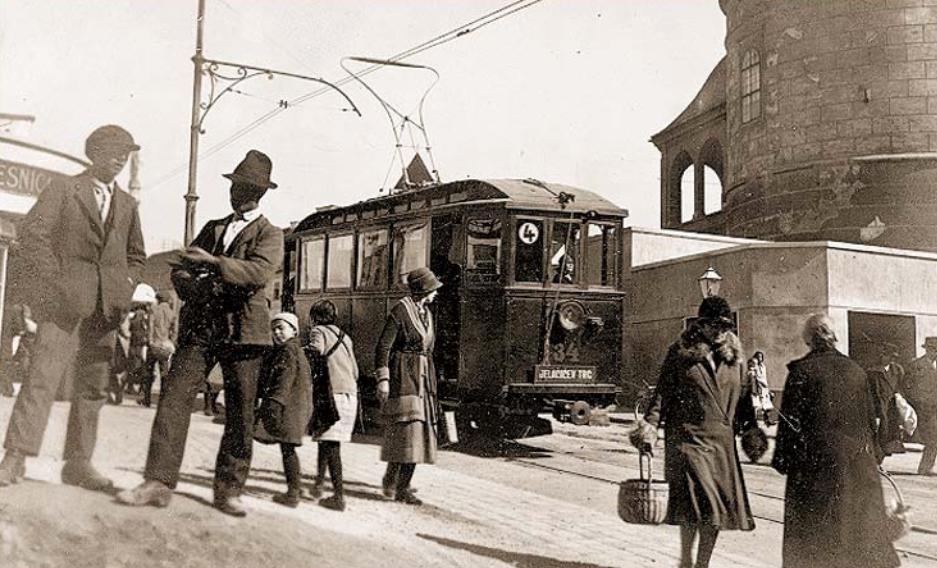
Ganz T-70 in the 1920s

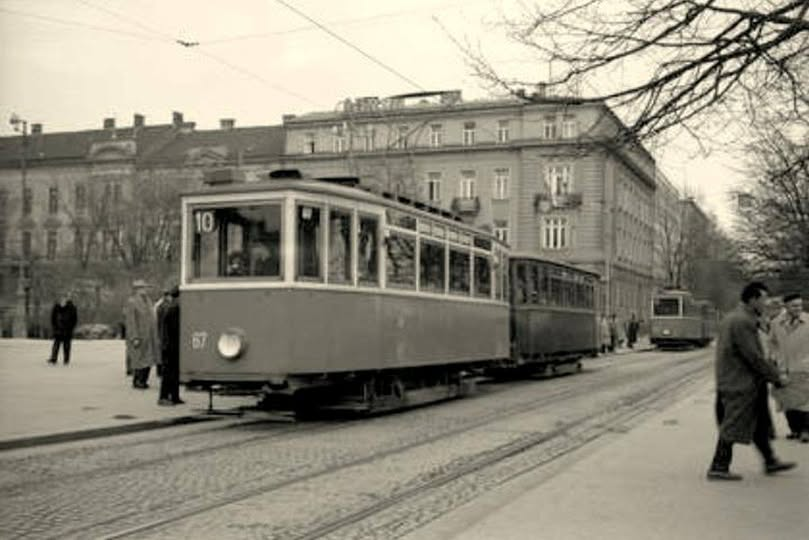
M-24 tram coming into Glavni kolodvor, 1961

The first electric tram track was opened on 18 August 1910. The gauge was kept to 1000 mm and the network voltage was 550 V at first, but later changed to 600 V. The horse-drawn trams were kept for another year until a tram electric network was finished, after which they were moved to Velika Gorica where they remained in use until 1937. 28 electric T-50 trams replaced the old fleet, produced by Ganz in Hungary. In 1911, an additional 7 T-70 trams were delivered, featuring a stronger engine and better brakes. The Belgian company Compagnie Mutuelle de Tramways was commissioned to maintain and invest in the tram infrastructure. In 1916, because of a lack of investment caused by the World War I, the service worsened, prompting the City Savings Bank to buy the majority of the shares of Zagreb Electric Tram, the transit authority in Zagreb, placing it in the hands of the city. The first trams built in Zagreb by ZET were the M-22 trams, designed by Dragutin Mandl. These trams entered production in 1922 and featured a wooden frame, characterized by a strong construction and a powerful engine. In 1923, the trams changed their colour from yellow, orange and red to the signature blue, which would later become the default for public transport in the city. Soon in 1924, the M-24 started production, an upgraded version with a steel frame. In the 40s and 50s, they were converted from double-end to single-end, and were put out of service in 1977, replaced by the Tatra T4YU trams. Trams used to drive on the left side of the road until 1926, when traffic was reorganised and driving switched to the right side. The tram depot on Savska Street was in use until 1936, when a new and bigger tram depot was built more westward in Ljubljanica.

In the following years, the tram network expanded, even during World War II, under the leadership of Dragutin Mandl. The first units built after the war were the two-axle TMK 101 trams, a big upgrade from the M-24 trams. Also designed by Mandl, the first three prototype units (TMK 100) were built by ZET workshops in 1951, but after it was concluded that ZET did not have the capacity to build that many trams, the work was given to the Đuro Đaković factory. Another 68 units with 110 matching trailers were built by 1965. A few of them were replaced by the GT6 series, but they were in regular use until the TMK 2200 series came in 2005, and were later retired in 2008. In the aftermath of the 1954 accident, where 19 people were killed after the brakes failed at a dangerously steep section of Mirogoj Street, tram service was suspended and later removed. Built from 1973 to 1975 by Đuro Đaković, TMK 201 trams were the successors of TMK 101 trams, being similarly designed, but technically significantly different. ZET used to have a total of 30 units with 32 trailers, but half were scrapped and their bases were reused in the production of TMK 2100 trams in the 90s. They were in use until 2025, being replaced by TMK 2400 trams.

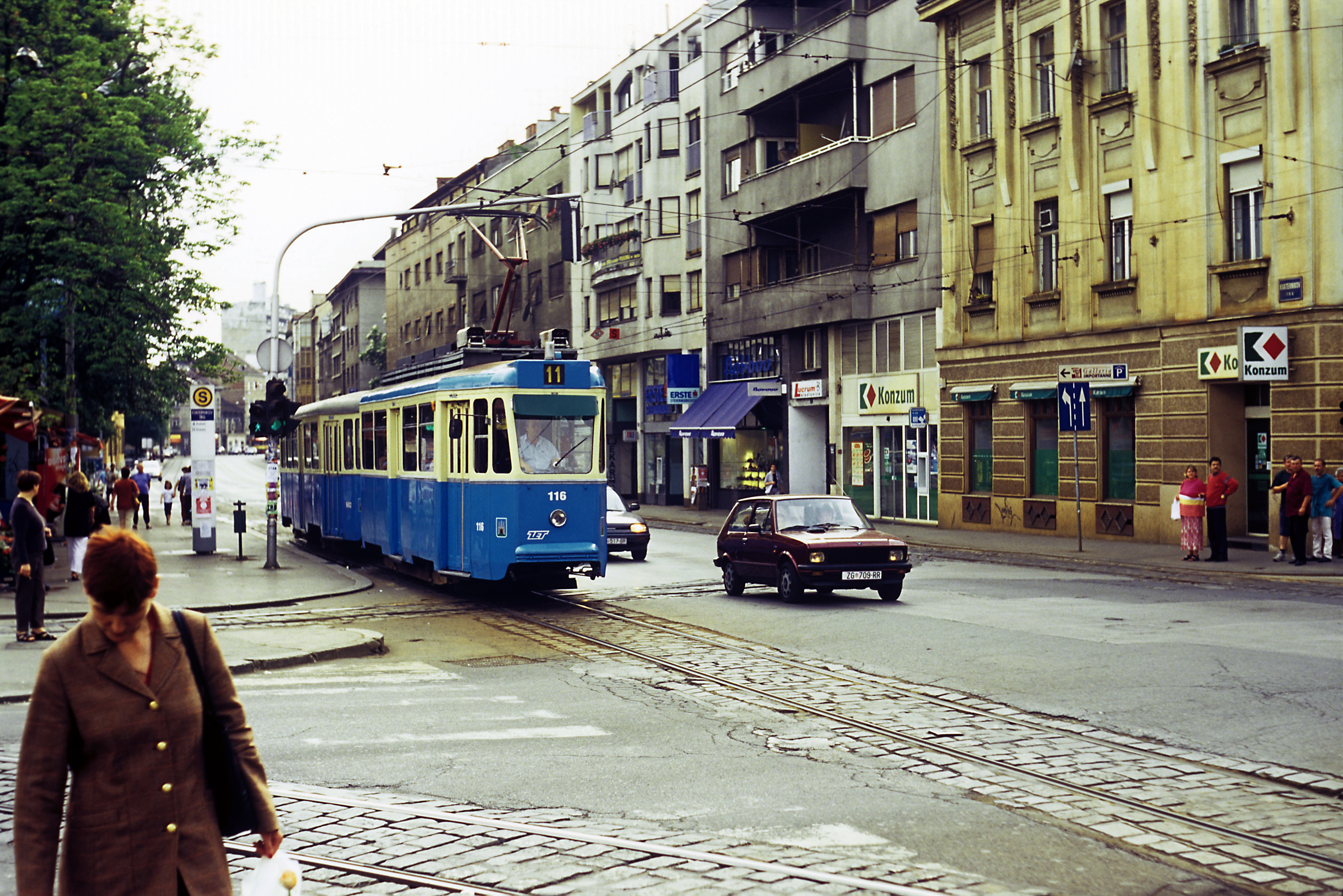
TMK 101 on Eugen Kvaternik Square, 2003

The first trams crossed the Sava river in 1979, when Sopot, in the Novi Zagreb district, was connected with Držićeva Street by the Youth Bridge. From 1976 to 1983, 95 Tatra T4YU units with corresponding B4YU trailers were manufactured for Zagreb by ČKD. The T4YU units are a type of the T4 series made for Yugoslavia, and have the same equipment as T4D units, which were used in Germany. They were nicknamed "Čeh", meaning "a Czech". From 1985 to 1986, Zagreb ordered and received 51 articulated Tatra KT4YU trams, a type of the KT4 series and an upgrade from the T4 series, which were nicknamed "Katica". As the population grew and the number of vehicles increased, in 1980, a new tram depot was built in Dubrava, in the east part of the city. Ljubljanica and Dubrava depots are still in use today. After the Croatian War of Independence, from 1994 to 1998, ZET bought and received 35 used Duewag GT6 trams (5 of them are GT6 "type Mannheim") from Mannheim, Germany. They were brought as a temporary solution, as the lack of funds prevented the buying of new vehicles. They did not last long on the streets and were eventually replaced by the new TMK 2200 trams and scrapped. In 1994, Končar built the TMK 2101 tram, a prototype of the TMK 2100, which was later produced from 1997 to 2003. A total of 16 units were built, including the prototype. Those were the first trams produced again in Croatia after the TMK 201 series. The last tracks were opened in 2000, to Dubec and Prečko districts.

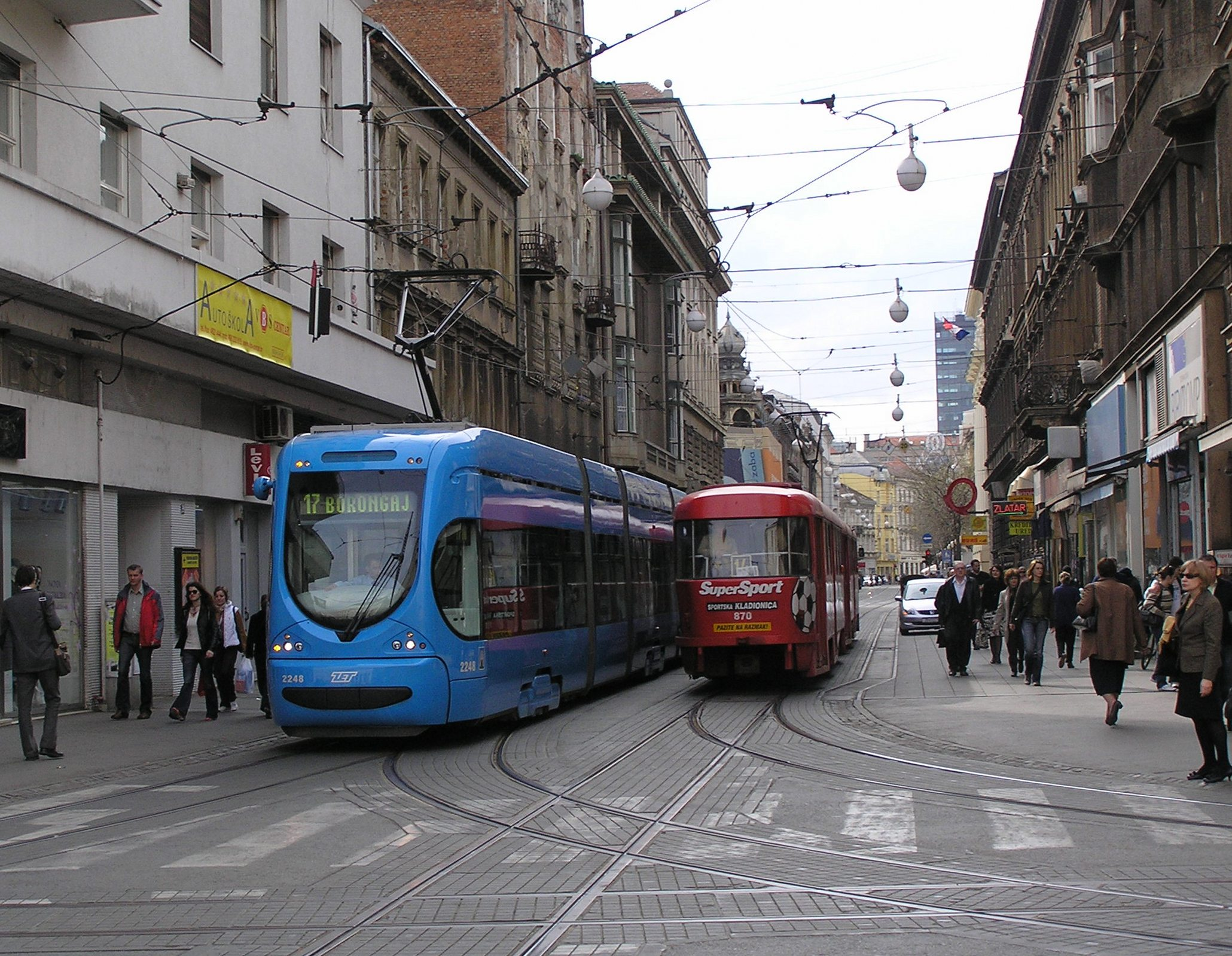
TMK 2200 (left) and Tatra T4YU, 2008

In 2003, ZET ordered 70 new, modern low-floor TMK 2200 trams from Crotram, a consortium led by Končar. In May 2005, the first prototype was delivered. It features air-conditioning, cameras inside and outside (instead of rear view mirrors), and a maximum speed of 70 km/h (43 mph). The last tram of the original order was delivered on 28 May 2007, and on 7 June, Zagreb organised a tram parade where all 70 TMK 2200 trams drove through the streets of Zagreb, to celebrate a new generation of low-floor trams. In July 2007, a contract for an additional 70 TMK 2200 vehicles was signed, which would have a redesigned seat layout allowing wider passages and additional handrails on the ceiling. The 140th unit entered service on 30 June 2010, featuring a redesigned seat layout allowing wider passages, and additional handrails on the ceiling. In 2009 and 2010, ZET received 2 TMK 2300 (TMK 2200-K) trams, shorter versions of the TMK 2200s. They operate on less busy and nighttime lines.

In spring of 2023, the city initiated an international public tender for the purchase of 11 second-hand trams worth €2.7 million, to which Stadtwerke Augsburg responded by offering 11 Adtranz GT6M trams. ZET received the first unit on 1 December, and after testing, the tram went into service on 27 December. In 2023 and 2024, ZET signed two contracts with Končar to buy a total of 40 new TMK 2400 trams, an upgraded version of the TMK 2300 model, worth around €80 million. The first unit entered service on 10 March 2025.

=== Construction of tram tracks ===
Year opened	Location		Notes
Year opened	From	To	Notes
1891	Vodovodna Street (today Mandaličina Street)	Eugen Kvaternik Square	Via Vlaška Street, Ban Jelačić Square, Ilica Street
1891	West Railway Station	Ilica	
1891	Ban Jelačić Square	Sava Bridge	Via University Square (today Republic of Croatia Square)
1892	Ban Jelačić Square	Main Railway Station	
1892	Eugen Kvaternik Square	Maksimir Park	
1910	West Railway Station	Drašković Street	Via Vjekoslav Klaić Street
1911	Vodovodna Street	Črnomerec	
1911	Ban Jelačić Square	Mirogoj Cemetery	Via Kaptol and Nova Ves Street
1924	Drašković Street	Knez Branimir Street	
1926	Eugen Kvaternik Square	Sajmište	Via Vjekoslav Heinzel Street
1928	Knez Branimir Street	Sigečica	
1931	Drašković Street	Medvešćak Street	
1933	Gupčeva zvijezda	Matija Jandrić Street	
1935	Drašković Street	August Harambašić Street	Via Victims of Fascism Square
1936	Savska Road	Ljubljanica	Opened together with the Ljubljanica tram depot
1942	Maksimir Park	Dubrava	
1945	Savska Road	Main Railway Station	
1946	Drašković Street	Victims of Fascism Square	Via Knez Mislav Street
1946	West Railway Station	Savska Road	
1948	Matija Jandrić Street	Mihaljevac	
1949	Savska Road	Vjekoslav Heinzel Street	Via Moskovska Street (today City of Vukovar Street)
1950	Mihaljevac	Dolje	
1950	Vjekoslav Heinzel Street	Žitnjak	
1961	Knez Branimir Street	Eugen Kvaternik Square	Via Pavao Šubić Street
1962	Knez Branimir Street	Trnje	Via Marin Držić Street
1963	August Harambašić Street	Borongaj	
1979	Marin Držić Street	Sopot	Crossed the Sava river for the first time
1985	Sava Bridge	Sopot	
1987	Sava Bridge	Jarun	
1990	Žitnjak	Savišće	
2000	Dubrava	Dubec	
2000	Jarun	Prečko	
Closed tracks
1924	West Railway Station	Drašković Street	Via Vjekoslav Klaić Street, demolished 1928
1930	Ban Jelačić Square	Gupčeva zvijezda	Via Kaptol and Nova Ves Street
1954	Eugen Kvaternik Square	Sajmište	
1967	Gupčeva zvijezda	Mirogoj Cemetery	Was also closed from 1954 to 1964 due to a fatal accident, replaced with busses

== Network ==
ZET Tram Lines Map

In 2024, ZET trams transported 121.83 million people, almost 333,773 every day. The majority of stations serve multiple tram lines. Trams are more frequent on work days, especially during rush hour, and the least frequent on Sunday. Daytime lines come every 5–15 minutes on average.

=== Daytime lines ===
Line	From	Via	To	Depot	Notes
1	West railway station (Zapadni kolodvor)	Ban Jelačić Square	Borongaj	Trešnjevka	Does not operate on weekends and public holidays
2	Črnomerec	Jukić Street, Central Railway Station, Zagreb Bus Terminal	Savišće	Trešnjevka	
3	Ljubljanica	City of Vukovar Street	Savišće	Trešnjevka	Does not operate on weekends and public holidays
4	Sava bridge	Central railway station, Maksimir Park	Dubec	Dubrava	
5	Prečko	City of Vukovar Street, Bus Terminal	Maksimir Park	Trešnjevka	
6	Črnomerec	Ban Jelačić Square, Central Railway Station, Bus terminal	Sopot	Dubrava	
7	Sava Bridge	Zagreb Fair, Bus terminal	Dubrava	Dubrava	
8	Zapruđe	Bus terminal	Mihaljevac	Dubrava	Does not operate on weekends and public holidays
9	Ljubljanica	Central Railway Station	Borongaj	Trešnjevka	
11	Črnomerec	Ban Jelačić Square, Maksimir Park	Dubec	Trešnjevka / Dubrava	
12	Ljubljanica	Ban Jelačić Square	Dubrava	Trešnjevka	
13	Žitnjak	City of Vukovar Street, Ban Jelačić Square, Central Railway Station	Eugen Kvaternik Square	Dubrava	
14	Mihaljevac	Ban Jelačić Square, Savska Road, Zagreb Fair	Zapruđe	Dubrava	
15	Mihaljevac	Gračani	Gračansko Dolje	Dubrava	
17	Prečko	Savska Road (Savska cesta), Ban Jelačić Square	Borongaj	Trešnjevka	

Line 15 is a specific exception: the line is closer to a light rail line than an actual tram line. It runs for approximately 3 km (1.9 mi) from Mihaljevac to Dolje. The line runs on a completely segregated right of way. A special type of catenary was developed for the line, which allows trams to reach speeds of 60 km/h (37 mph). Thus, the line from Mihaljevac to Dolje is the fastest and the shortest line in the entire tram network. It was opened in the 1950.

=== Nighttime lines ===
Line	From	Via	To	Depot	Notes
31	Črnomerec	Ban Jelačić Square, Central Railway Station, Zagreb Bus Terminal, Zagreb Fair	Sava Bridge	Dubrava	
32	Prečko	Savska Road, Ban Jelačić Square	Borongaj	Trešnjevka	Route is equivalent to daytime line 17
33	Gračansko Dolje	Central Railway Station, Valentin Vodnik Street, City of Vukovar Street	Savišće	Dubrava	
34	Ljubljanica	Ban Jelačić square, Central railway station, Maksimir Road (Maksimirska cesta)	Dubec	Trešnjevka	

=== Discontinued lines ===
Line	From	Via	To	Discontinued	Reason
18	Ljubljanica	Ban Jelačić Square	Victims of Fascism Square	1954	Reorganization of tram lines
10	Sava Bridge	Main Railway Station, Victims of Fascism Square	Borongaj	1982	Overlapping with line 1
16	Črnomerec	Savska Road	Zapruđe	1991	Shortage of drivers during the Croatian War of Independence, replaced with bus line 109

=== Stops ===
Stop	Position	Lines served
Aleja javora	45.828833°N 16.068143°E	4, 11, 34
Arena Zagreb	45.777792°N 15.952773°E	7, 14, 31
Autobusni kolodvor	45.803640°N 15.993959°E	2, 5, 6, 7, 8, 31
Badalićeva	45.801991°N 15.959744°E	3, 9, 12, 34
Belostenčeva	45.822268°N 15.979831°E	8, 14, 33
Borongaj	45.814263°N 16.018262°E	1, 9, 17, 32
Borovje	45.788538°N 16.004229°E	6, 7, 8, 31
Botanički vrt	45.805640°N 15.974291°E	2, 4, 9, 33
Branimirova	45.805490°N 15.983657°E	2, 4, 6, 9, 13, 31, 34
Branimirova tržnica	45.806139°N 15.992007°E	2, 6, 8, 31
Britanski trg	45.812271°N 15.963182°E	1, 6, 11, 31
Čavićeva	45.800808°N 16.031040°E	2, 3, 13, 33
Črnomerec	45.815038°N 15.934409°E	2, 6, 11, 31
Čulinečka	45.828952°N 16.062393°E	4, 11, 34
Dankovečka	45.829444°N 16.054666°E	4, 11, 34
Donje Svetice	45.803122°N 16.015242°E	2, 3, 13, 33
Draškovićeva	45.813390°N 15.983473°E	4, 8, 11, 12, 14, 33, 34
Držićeva	45.801036°N 15.994382°E	2, 3, 5, 6, 7, 8, 13, 31, 33
Dubec	45.827861°N 16.077899°E	4, 11, 34
Dubrava	45.824479°N 16.037645°E	4, 7, 11, 12, 34
Elka	45.797111°N 16.037396°E	2, 3, 33
Ferenščica	45.804316°N 16.023310°E	2, 3, 13, 33
Folnegovićevo naselje	45.792222°N 16.002249°E	6, 7, 8, 31
Frankopanska	45.813276°N 15.969426°E	1, 6, 11, 12, 13, 14, 17, 31, 32, 34
Getaldićeva	45.802931°N 16.026804°E	2, 3, 13, 33
Glavni kolodvor	45.805234°N 15.978432°E	2, 4, 6, 9, 13, 31, 33, 34
Gračani	45.858139°N 15.973871°E	15
Gračanske stube	45.849006°N 15.975305°E	15
Gračanski Mihaljevac	45.853578°N 15.973254°E	15
Gračansko dolje	45.860605°N 15.981570°E	15
Grižanska	45.828792°N 16.052429°E	4, 11, 34
Grškovićeva	45.820042°N 15.979449°E	8, 14, 33
Gupčeva zvijezda	45.827621°N 15.979580°E	8, 14, 33
Harambašićeva	45.814699°N 16.007994°E	1, 9, 17, 32
Heinzelova	45.812042°N 16.001233°E	1, 2, 3, 9, 13, 17, 32, 33
HNK 2	45.807602°N 15.961971°E	2
Hondlova	45.820953°N 16.022354°E	4, 7, 11, 12, 34
Horvati	45.788208°N 15.940739°E	5, 17, 32
Hrvatskog sokola	45.789886°N 15.920036°E	5, 17, 32
Ivanićgradska	45.804017°N 16.020662°E	2, 3, 13, 33
Jandrićeva	45.836496°N 15.977473°E	8, 14, 33
Jarun	45.787783°N 15.930094°E	5, 17, 32
Jordanovac	45.817588°N 16.008022°E	4, 5, 7, 11, 12, 34
Kapucinska	45.827550°N 16.048597°E	4, 11, 34
Klinika za traumatologiju		4, 8, 33, 34
Knežija	45.788154°N 15.945337°E	5, 17, 32
Kruge	45.800600°N 15.985636°E	3, 5, 13, 33
Kvaternikov trg	45.814933°N 15.997234°E	4, 11, 12, 13, 34
Lisinski	45.800201°N 15.977771°E	3, 5, 13, 33
Ljubijska	45.825997°N 16.043834°E	4, 11, 34
Ljubljanica	45.797197°N 15.937682°E	3, 9, 12, 34
Mandaličina	45.812379°N 15.948411°E	2, 6, 11, 31
Marijane Radev	45.793076°N 15.902186°E	5, 17, 32
Mašićeva	45.816578°N 16.003131°E	4, 5, 7, 11, 12, 34
Mihaljevac	45.842513°N 15.975162°E	8, 14, 15, 33
Miramarska	45.800050°N 15.975333°E	3, 5, 13, 33
Most mladosti	45.782375°N 16.001456°E	6, 7, 8, 31
Munja	45.792433°N 16.038006°E	2, 3, 33
Muzej suvremene umjetnosti	45.777490°N 15.979651°E	7, 14, 31
Nehajska	45.798708°N 15.948223°E	3, 9, 12, 34
Olipska	45.801337°N 16.000265°E	2, 3, 13, 33
Park Maksimir	45.818647°N 16.012137°E	4, 5, 7, 11, 12, 34
Petrova	45.813921°N 15.991206°E	4, 11, 12, 34
Petrovaradinska	45.792571°N 15.905606°E	5, 17, 32
Poljanice IV	45.828194°N 16.072789°E	4, 11, 34
Prečko	45.794265°N 15.892724°E	5, 17, 32
Prisavlje	45.790396°N 15.956027°E	4, 5, 14, 17, 32
Radićevo šetalište	45.831766°N 15.978032°E	8, 14, 33
Radnička	45.801491°N 16.003844°E	2, 3, 13, 33
Ravnice	45.822108°N 16.027649°E	4, 7, 11, 12, 34
Savišće	45.789054°N 16.034499°E	33
Savski gaj	45.777148°N 15.956306°E	7, 14, 31
Savski most	45.786030°N 15.953180°E	4, 7, 31
Selska	45.797677°N 15.942373°E	3, 9, 12, 34
Sheraton	45.808049°N 15.984451°E	4, 8, 9, 13, 33, 34
Slavenskog	45.794190°N 15.898904°E	5, 17, 32
Slavonska	45.796879°N 15.998633°E	6, 7, 8, 31
Slovenska	45.812508°N 15.952482°E	2, 6, 11, 31
Sopot	45.777687°N 15.986791°E	6, 7, 14, 31
Središće	45.777792°N 15.989335°E	6, 7, 14, 31
Srednjaci	45.788124°N 15.936809°E	5, 17, 32
Strojarska	45.800731°N 15.988801°E	3, 5, 13, 33
Studentski centar	45.802476°N 15.964270°E	3, 4, 13, 14, 17, 32, 33
Studentski dom Stjepan Radić	45.786300°N 15.951738°E	5, 7, 14, 17, 31, 32
Sveti Duh	45.813209°N 15.943122°E	2, 6, 11, 31
Svetice	45.815354°N 16.013477°E	1, 9, 17, 32
Sveučilišna aleja	45.799838°N 15.971155°E	3, 5, 13, 33
Šubićeva	45.809914°N 15.992894°E	1, 5, 7, 9, 13, 17, 32
Šulekova	45.813175°N 16.004426°E	1, 9, 17, 32
Talovčeva	45.809649°N 15.957024°E	2
Tehnički muzej	45.803266°N 15.964365°E	3, 9, 12, 34
Trešnjevački trg	45.800059°N 15.954793°E	3, 9, 12, 34
Trg bana J. Jelačića	45.554941°N 18.720188°E	1, 6, 11, 12, 13, 14, 17, 31, 32, 34
Trg dr. F. Tuđmana	45.812814°N 15.957425°E	1, 2, 6, 11, 31
Trg hrvatskih velikana	45.811794°N 15.984249°E	1, 17, 32
Trg Petra Krešimira IV	45.807632°N 15.991672°E	5, 7
Trg Republike Hrvatske	45.808748°N 15.968669°E	12, 13, 14, 17, 32, 34
Trg žrtava fašizma	45.810012°N 15.988366°E	1, 9, 13, 17, 32
Trnsko	45.777131°N 15.964680°E	7, 14, 31
Tržnica Kvatrić	45.814003°N 15.996467°E	5, 7, 13
Tuškanova	45.811144°N 15.997801°E	1, 9, 17, 32
Učiteljski fakultet	45.796513°N 15.960204°E	4, 5, 14, 17, 32
Utrina	45.777980°N 15.997877°E	6, 7, 14, 31
Velesajam	45.777294°N 15.970808°E	7, 14, 31
Veslačka	45.788640°N 15.954836°E	4, 5, 14, 17, 32
Vjesnik	45.793416°N 15.958087°E	4, 5, 14, 17, 32
Vodnikova	45.805413°N 15.967636°E	2, 4, 9, 12, 13, 14, 17, 32, 33, 34
Vončinina	45.813777°N 15.986367°E	4, 11, 12, 34
Vrbani	45.791626°N 15.914670°E	5, 17, 32
Vrbik	45.799655°N 15.967583°E	3, 5, 33
Zagreb. transporti	45.790949°N 16.036487°E	33
Zagrepčanka	45.799434°N 15.963311°E	3, 4, 5, 13, 14, 17, 32, 33
Zapadni kolodvor	45.809469°N 15.954838°E	1
Zapruđe	45.778082°N 16.000326°E	6, 7, 8, 14, 31, 31
Zrinjevac	45.809126°N 15.977815°E	6, 13, 31, 34
Žitnjak	45.798854°N 16.034807°E	2, 3, 13, 33

== Rolling stock ==
The rolling stock includes 259 motor units of 8 different tram types, of which 154 are low-floor trams. Most of the stock today consists of TMK 2200 trams, a total of 140 units acquired from 2005 to 2010. The next most common tram type is made by ČKD, comprising a total of 95 T4YU units with 85 matching B4YU trailers, and 51 articulated KT4YU units. T4YU vehicles entered service between 1976 and 1983, and KT4YU followed in 1985.

=== Trams ===
Picture	Name	Manufacturer	In operation	Notes
	-	Graz factory	1891 – 1911	Horse-drawn
	-	Graz factory	1891 – 1911	Horse-drawn, open-air type
Electrification of the network (1910)
	T-50	Ganz	1910 – 1930s	Converted into trailers
	T-70	Ganz	1911 – 1930s	Converted into freight trams and M-24 trams
	M-22	ZET	1922 – 1950s	Wooden frame
	M-24	ZET	1924 – 1977	
	TMK 100	ZET, Đuro Đaković	1951 – 2008	Prototype for TMK 101 units
	TMK 101	ZET, Đuro Đaković	1951 – 2008	
	TMK 200	Đuro Đaković	1966 – 1992	Prototype for TMK 201 units
	TMK 201	Đuro Đaković	1974 – 2025	
	Tatra T4YU	ČKD	1976 – present	
	Tatra KT4YU	ČKD	1985 – present	
	TMK 900	Đuro Đaković	1993 – 2007	Prototype, helped in the development of TMK 2100
	GT6	Duewag	1994 – 2009	Bought used
	GT6 Mannheim	Duewag	1996 – 2009	Bought used
	TMK 2100	Končar, TŽV Gredelj	1997 – present	
	TMK 2200	Crotram	2005 – present	
	TMK 2300	Crotram	2009 – present	Shorter version of the TMK 2200
	GT6M	Adtranz	2024 – present	Bought used
	TMK 2400	Končar	2025 – present	

=== Trailers ===
Picture	Name	Manufacturer	In operation	Notes
	TP 591	Đuro Đaković	1951 – 2008	Made for TMK 100 and TMK 101 trams
	TP 701	Đuro Đaković	1974 – 2025	Made for TMK 200 and TMK 201 trams
	Tatra B4YU	ČKD	1976 – present	Made for Tatra T4YU trams

=== Museum units ===
ZET preserves old trams for showcases on ZET anniversaries, and for occasional rides on the museum line 21. This includes two museum units of M-24 trams, one with a "Košak" trailer built by ZET, and the other with "Pagoda" trailer, which was formerly a motor car made by Ganz. These trams are used for kids rides during the Zagreb Christmas Market. ZET has another tram type in its museum fleet, the TMK 101. Soon the Duewag GT6 & TMK 201 will be added to the museum fleet.

== Gallery ==
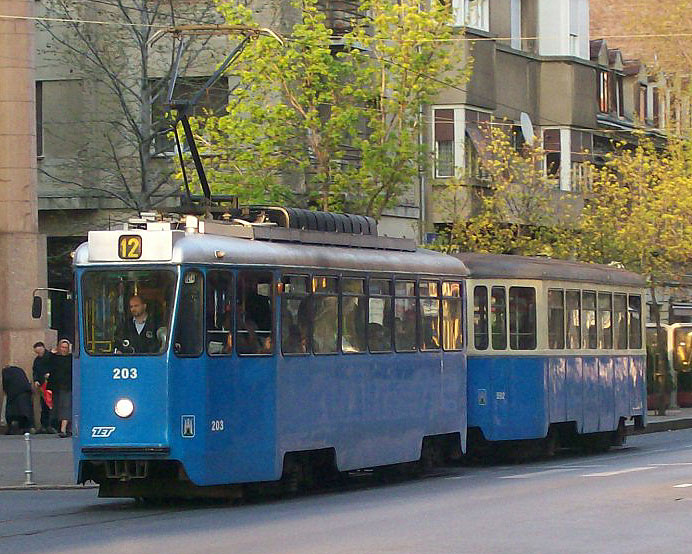
ĐĐ TMK 201, 30 units built 1973-1974 by Đuro Đaković

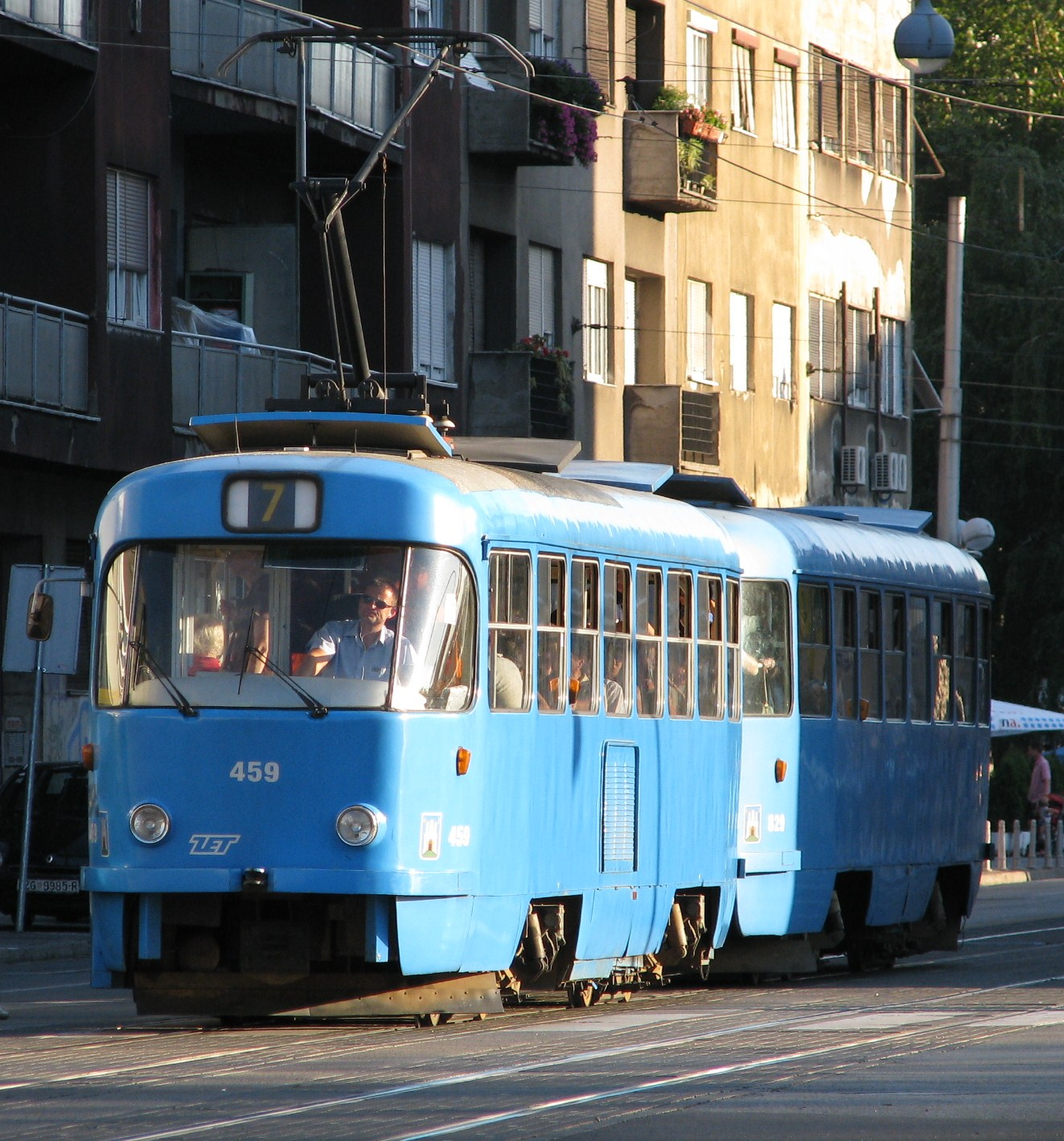
ČKD Tatra T4YU, Type 401, 95 units built 1976-1982

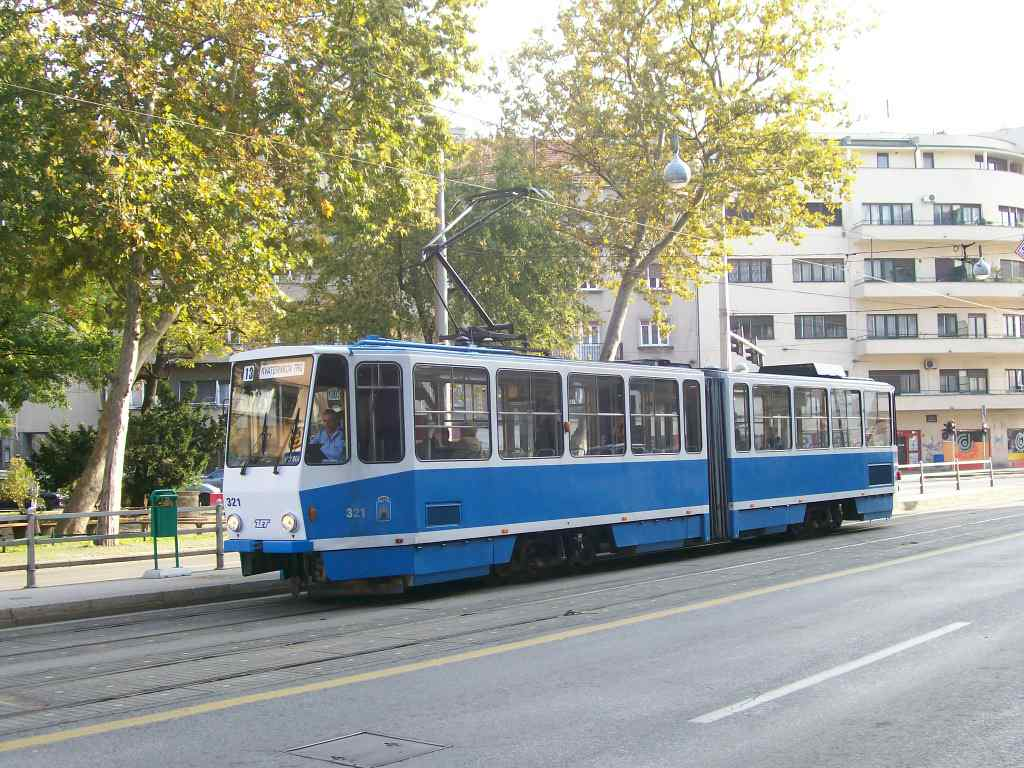
ČKD Tatra KT4YU, Type 301, 51 units built 1985-1986

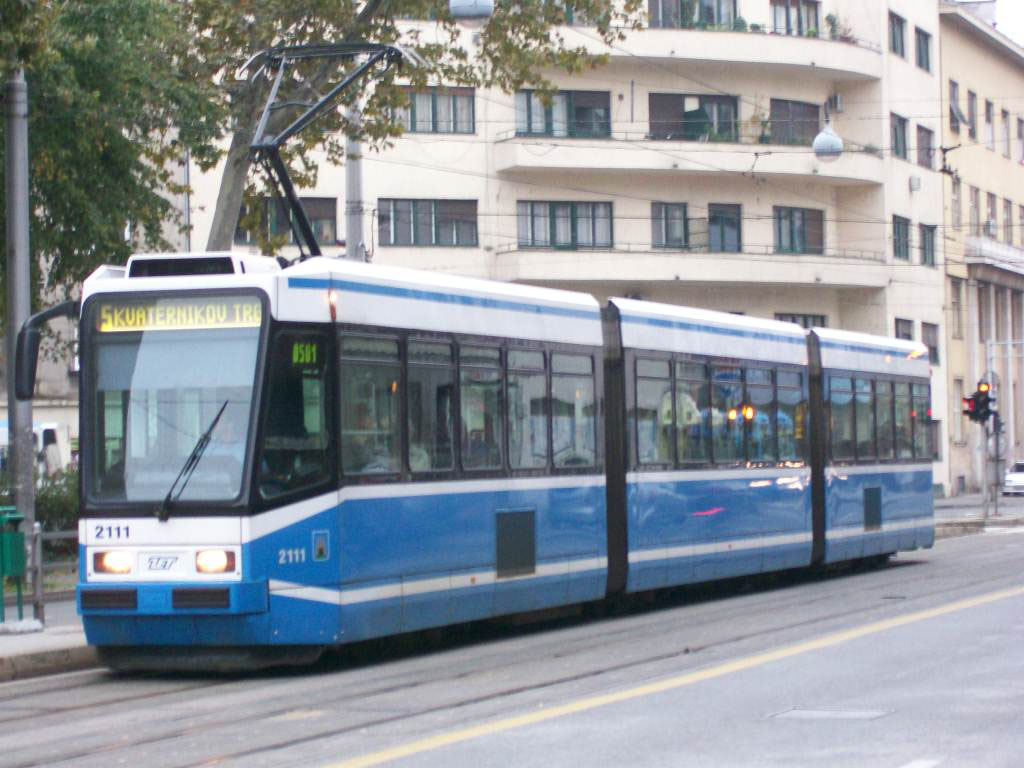
Končar TMK 2100, 16 units built 1994-2002 by Končar and TŽV Gredelj

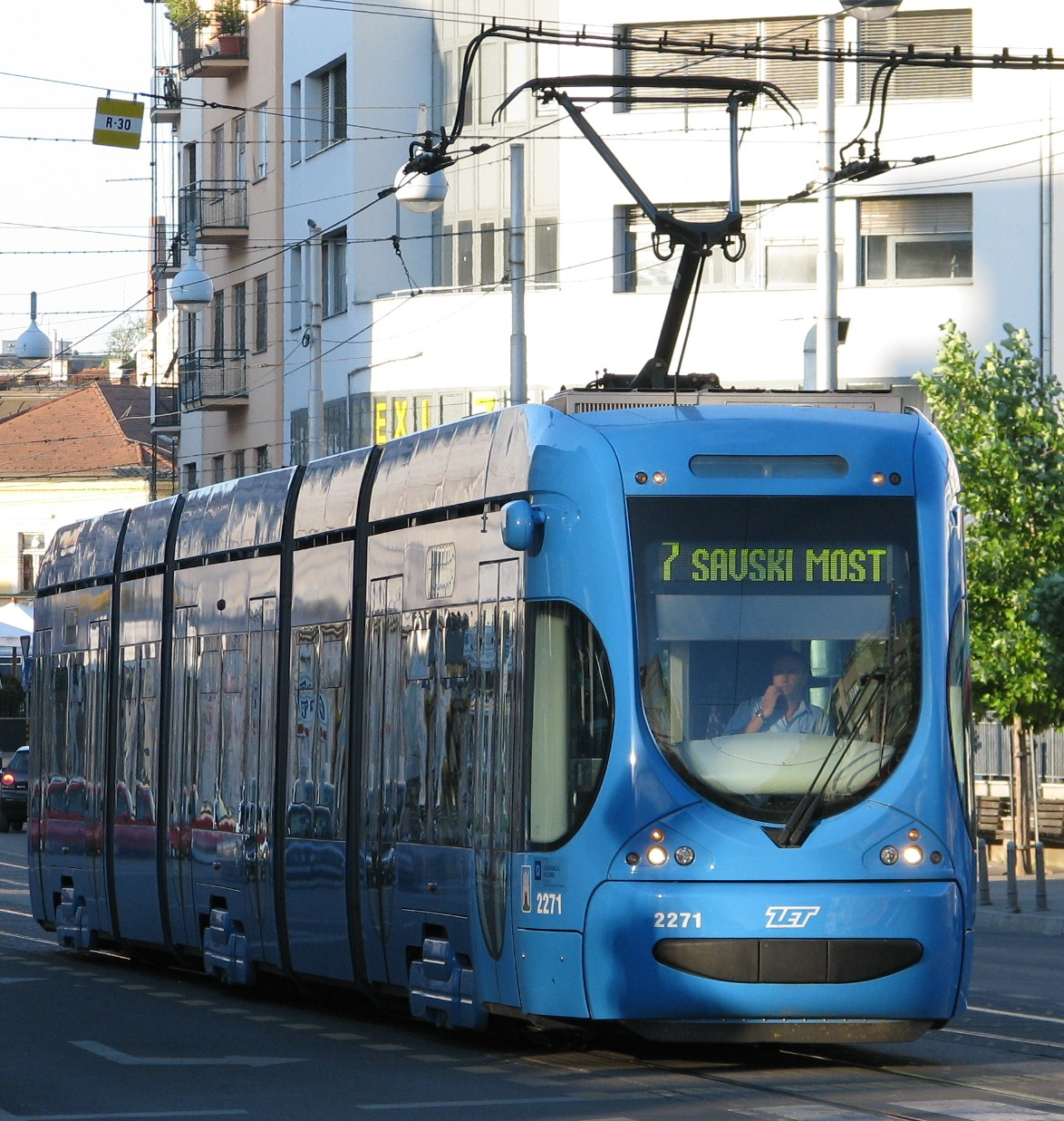
TMK 2200, 140 units built 2005-2012 by Crotram

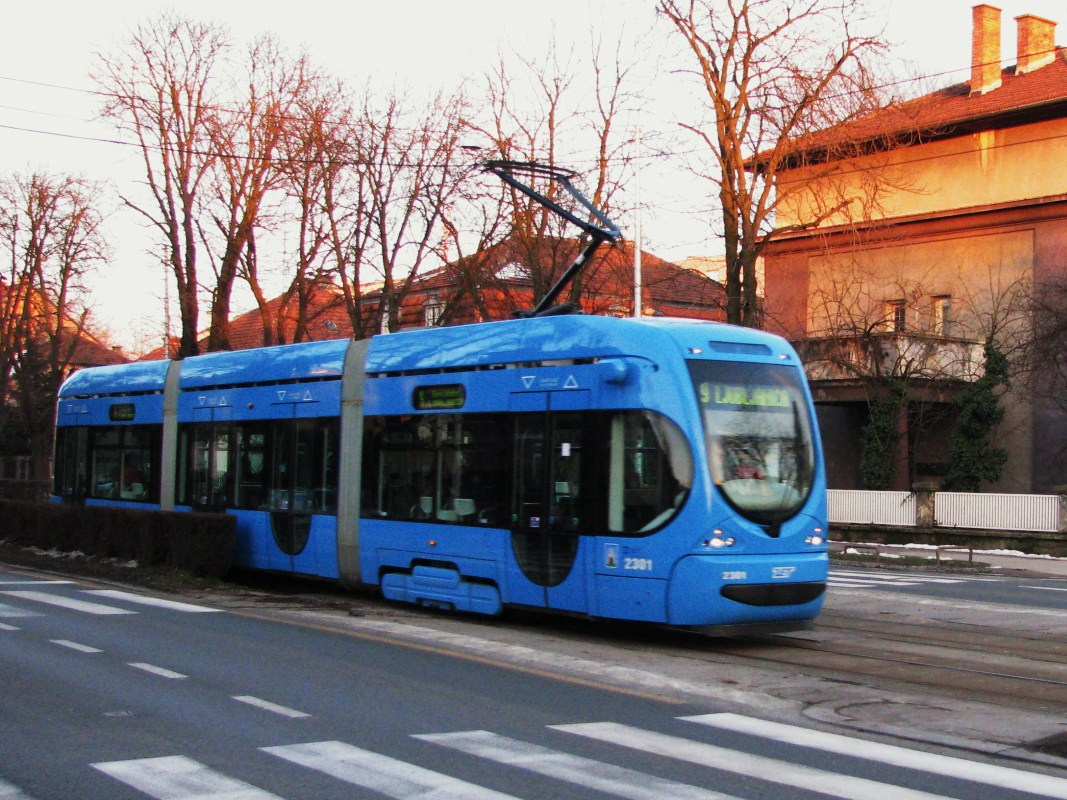
TMK 2300, 2 units built 2009-10 by Končar

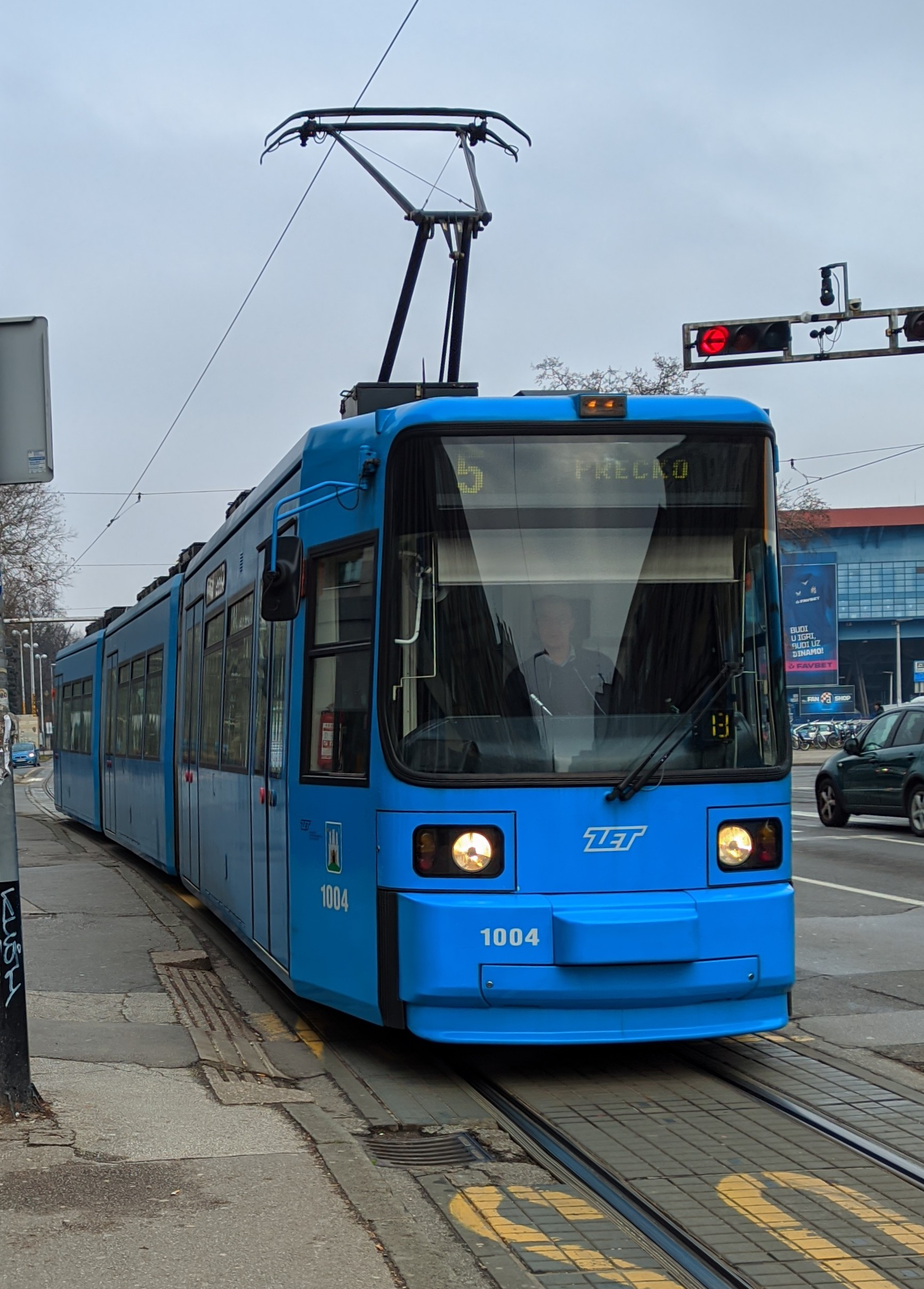
Adtranz GT6M, 7 units bought from Augsburg in 2023, currently 4 on order

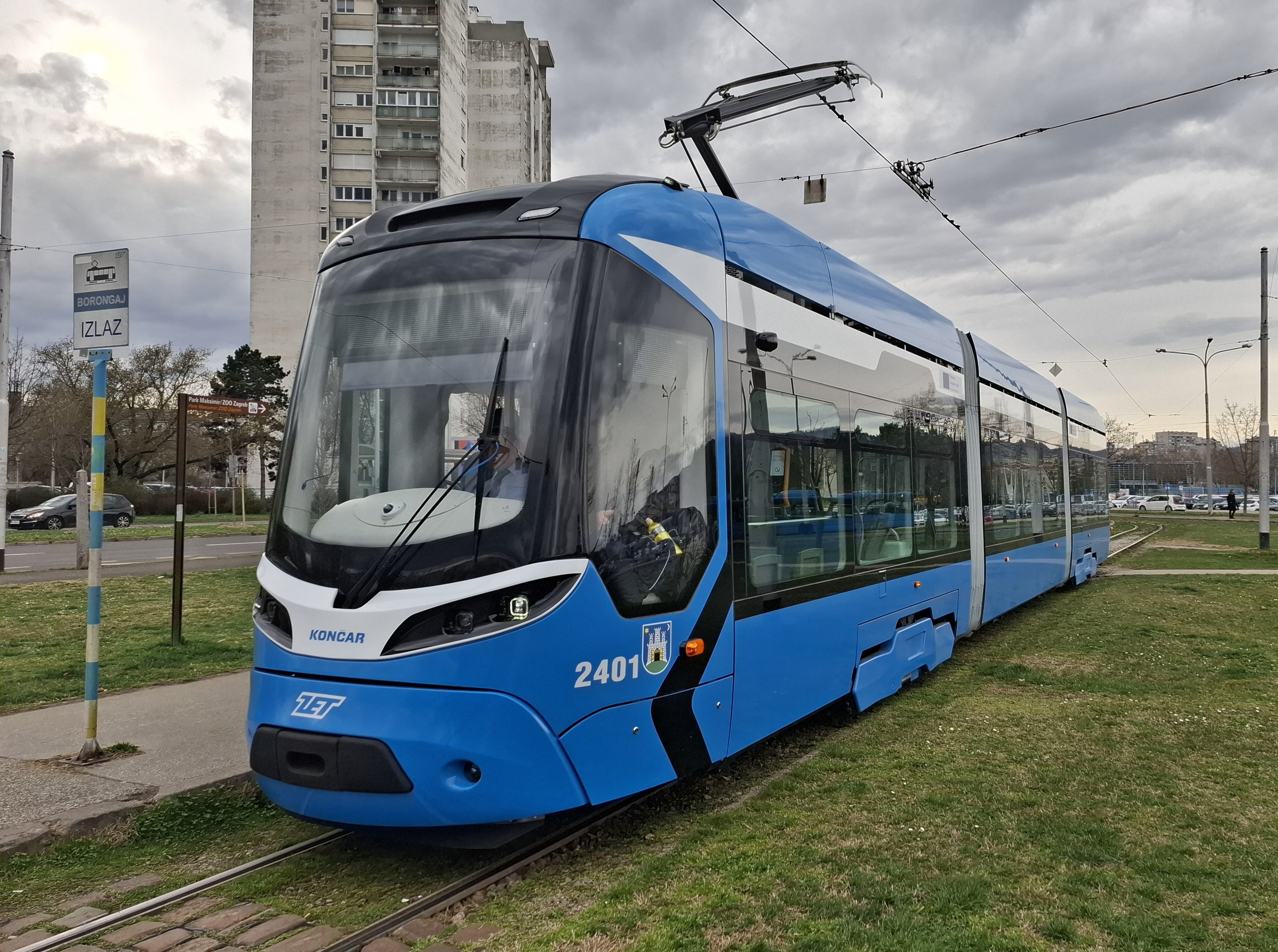
TMK 2400, 20 units delivered in 2025

== See also ==
- Trams in Osijek
- Trams in Europe
- Tram
- Transport in Zagreb
