= Corpus Christi Church, Zagreb =

Corpus Christi Church (Croatian: Župna crkva Tijela Kristova)
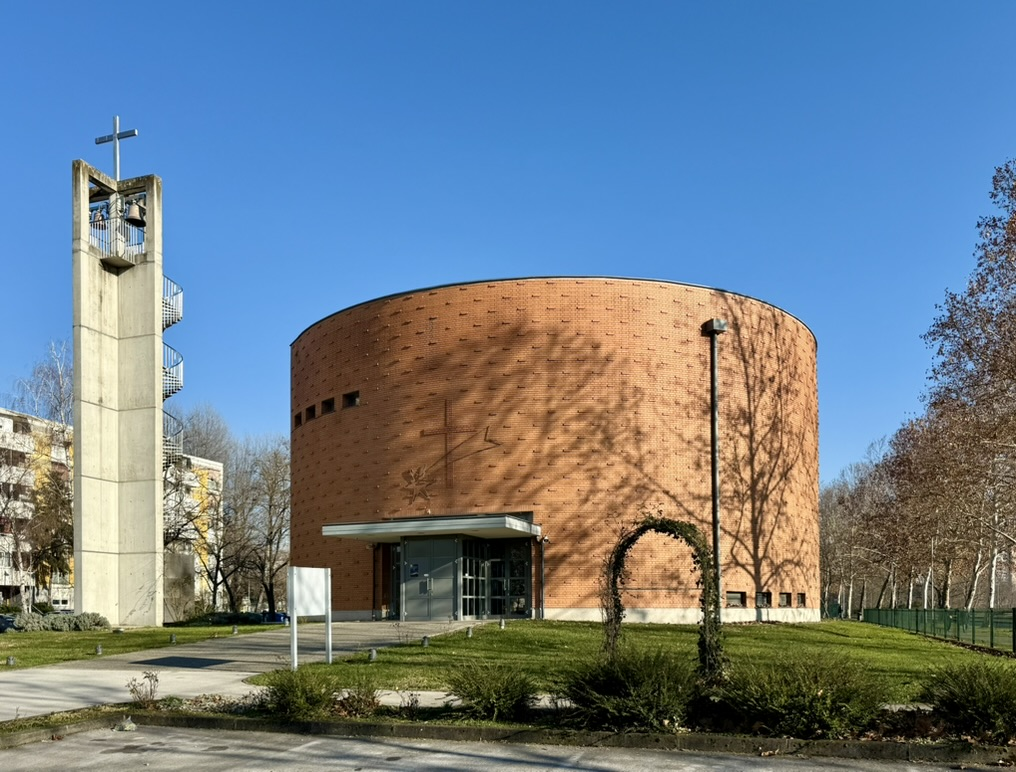
- View of the church
- Corpus Christi Church (Croatian: Župna crkva Tijela Kristova)
- 45°46′19″N 15°59′05″E
- Location: Zagreb
- Country: Croatia
- Denomination: Roman Catholic

Architecture
- Functional status: Active
- Completed: 2005

Corpus Christi Church, Zagreb (Croatian: Župna crkva Tijela Kristova u Zagrebu) is a Catholic parish church located in the neighbourhood Sopot of Zagreb, Croatia.

== History ==
The parish church of Corpus Christi was built in 2005. In 2013, it was consecrated by the then Archbishop of Zagreb, Cardinal Josip Bozanić.

== Architecture ==
The conceptual designer of the church was architect Ivica Čizmek, and the executive designer was architect Hrvoje Krajač. The construction of the church was financed by the faithful and the Archdiocese of Zagreb.

== Gallery ==
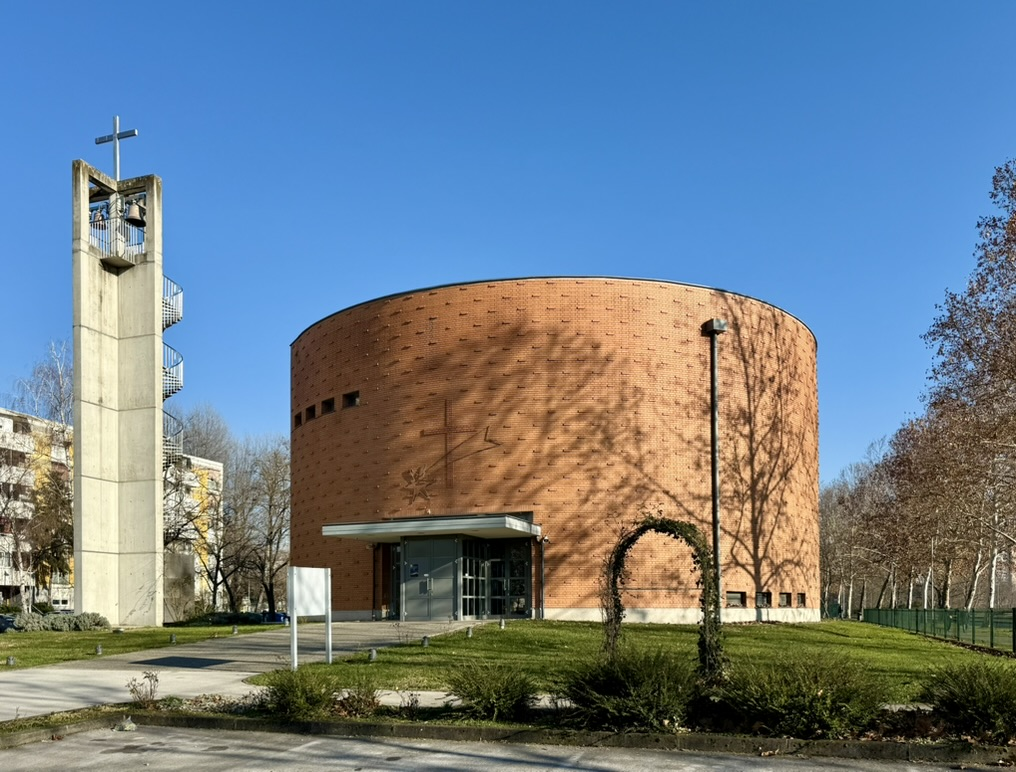
View of the church

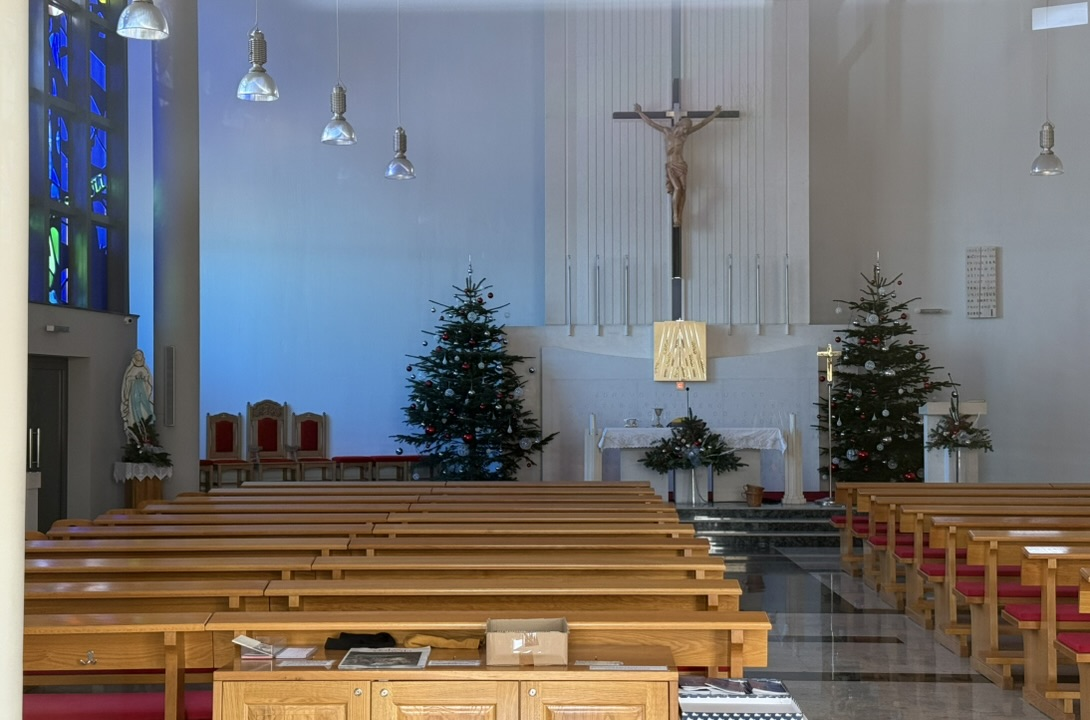
Interior of the church
