= GSP Belgrade =

Public transportation company in Belgrad, Serbia

- Native name: ГСП Београд / GSP Beograd
- Company type: State-owned enterprise
- Industry: Transportation
- Founded: 22 December 1989; 36 years ago (Current form); 14 October 1892; 133 years ago (Founded)
- Headquarters: Kneginje Ljubice 29, Belgrade, Serbia
- Area served: Belgrade
- Key people: Zoran Šarac (CEO)
- Revenue: ▲€200.36 million (2024)
- Net income: ▲ (€17.41 million) (2024)
- Total assets: ▲€323.15 million (2024)
- Total equity: ▼€70.63 million (2024)
- Number of employees: 5,535 (2024)
- Website: www.gsp.rs
- Footnotes / references Business ID: 07022662; Tax ID: 100049398

GSP Belgrade (Serbian: ГСП Београд / GSP Beograd) is a public transit company in the city of Belgrade.

== Name ==
The acronym "GSP" stands for Gradsko saobraćajno preduzeće (Serbian Cyrillic: Градско саобраћајно предузеће, lit. 'City Transport Company').

== History ==
Its history dates back to 14 October 1892 when the first horse tram line began operating in Belgrade between Slavija and Terazije. It was known under the name Beogradska varoška železnica (Serbian Cyrillic: Београдска варошка железница, lit. 'Belgrade Town Rail'). The first bus line was opened in 1925 and in 1947 the first trolleybuses appeared in Belgrade.

=== 1940–1990 ===
In 1940, the tram traffic plied on 10 lines. Belgrade has disposed of 104 trams, 60 trailers and 87 buses. The following year, the bombing of Belgrade destroyed 38 trams, 36 trailers and 10 buses. In 1945, the company changed its name to the Department of traffic lights and the Executive Committee of the City of Belgrade. In Belgrade Radio 4 tram and bus lines 3 with a total of 58 vehicles. In 1947, the first trolley was introduced to the line Kalemegdan – Slavija.

In 1955, in Belgrade was 8 tram lines with 162 trams, three trolley lines with 42 trolley buses and 14 bus routes with 148 buses. In 1956, he was released into operation first trolleybus domestic production - "Goša FOM". Belgrade and Zemun are associated trolley lines. As of 1960, there was 38 lines (7 tram, 6 trolleybus and 14 bus). Number of vehicles in inventory stood at 467. In 1961, 160 Leyland buses were purchased.

In 1962, cab vehicles were introduced, a total of 63 vehicles. In 1970, 144 new vehicles were purchased for the transport of Belgrade. The total number of vehicles has increased to 806. In 1975, new zonal tariff system was introduced and number of vehicles rose to 995. By 1985, the total number of vehicles was 1380, and the average number of vehicles in traffic in operation was, on weekdays was 779. In 1989, an integrated system of unified tariff system, in addition to Lasta and GSP in the system is turned on and ZTP Beograd and ATP Pancevo.

=== 1990–2000 ===
By the decision of the Assembly of Belgrade, GSP "Belgrade" in 1990 became a public utility company, founded by the city. In 1991, with a total of 1,393 vehicles, with average age of 4.5 years, the streets of Belgrade was at the peak was about 1,130 vehicles a day carrying about 2.5 million passengers. The crisis in the former Yugoslavia, which escalated in the second half of 1991, led to the introduction of economic sanctions by UN Security Council to Federal Republic of Yugoslavia, and the influx of a large number of displaced persons in Belgrade. Investments in the purchase of new vehicles, spare parts and maintenance of the infrastructure was minimal. During 1993, due to the inability of continuous maintenance of the public transport problems in the procurement of oil and tires, price growth, transport declined in the number of vehicles in traffic, so that at the end of the year only 400 vehicles were in operation. Some lines were eliminated or shortened. The function of public transport in Belgrade had been damaged.

During 1994 and 1995, the GSP managed to raise the level of transportation, revitalize the fleet to an average of 909 vehicles on weekdays. At the beginning of 1998, in public transport private transporters were included. Compared to the previous year, it had 127 vehicles less, along with a tendency of further decline. The unified tariff system ceased to exist and passed on ticketing in vehicles by the conductor. After the start of NATO bombing of Yugoslavia on 24 March 1999, GSP "Beograd" transferred to work in the war environment, which meant the abolition or curtailment of a large number of lines. In the aftermath of the NATO bombing, the problem was lack of vehicles. The unfavorable situation continued in 2000. The outdated fleet, low technical condition of vehicles, lack of spare parts, frequent reduction of traffic due to fuel shortages are only part of the problem that led to the introduction of emergency measures by the Republic government. Significant changes have taken place after the events of October 2000, when the city's new government has opted for the revitalization of the GSP, as a holder of public transport system in Belgrade. A goal that was set before GSP "Belgrade" was to reach the level of the enterprise from the beginning of the 1990s. By the end of the year, most of former lines were reestablished.

=== 2011–present ===
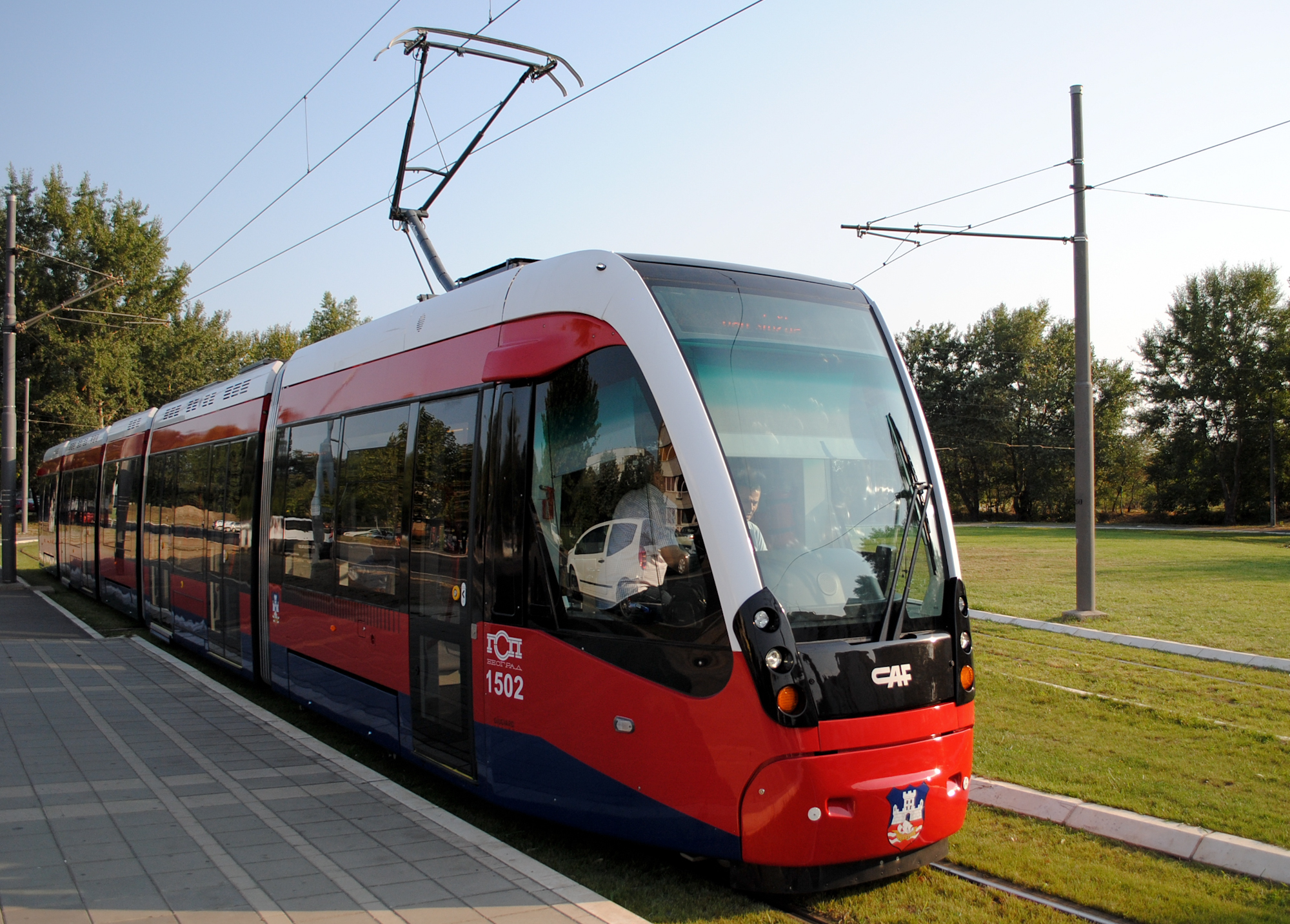
GSP Belgrade CAF Urbos 3 tram

In 2011, GSP Belgrade began with the acquisition of new CAF Urbos 3 trams. By the end of 2012, it supplied 30 trams of this model. The new trams are commonly referred to as Španac (Spaniard) by Belgrade's residents.

GSP Belgrade introduced BusPlus on 1 February 2012. BusPlus is an electronic payment method where commuters load fares on a thin plastic card. Also, the private carriers were introduced and integrated in tariff system – Integrated Tariff System (ITS). There are 145 lines, out of which 12 are tram, 8 are trolleybus and 125 are bus lines. Service operates daily between 4 am and midnight, with a limited night bus system. GSP also operates school bus lines, and transportation for the disabled. The entire traffic grid is divided in two zones.

As of 2017, GSP Belgrade has 1,582 vehicles in operation. Most of GSP's revenue is still generated through subsidies by the city of Belgrade; in 2017, that amount stood at 65 million euros. As of 2018, GSP operated with 170 lines and had 1,611 active vehicles.

In April 2019, GSP along with the city of Belgrade signed a contract to purchase 244 new buses, of which 70 are manufactured by Turkish BMC and 174 by Chinese Higer.

In October 2021, GSP signed a contract to purchase 100 CNG buses with Turkish BMC.

In April 2023, the City Assembly of Belgrade voted in favour of terminating the contract with KentKart which provided the BusPlus tracking app, as well as fare collection services.

A brand new state-owned enterprise called "Naplata prevozne usluge" was created, dedicated to collecting GSP fares. The Municipal police was tasked with collecting fares which are now bought through SMS.

While the fares became quite a bit cheaper, this was a controversial decision because the termination of the Kentkart contract meant the BusPlus transit tracking app stopped working, as the city didn't have access to GPS data of individual transit vehicles. A brand new app with the same features was promised but is yet to be delivered in July 2023. Besides this, transit also started running late more often and holes in the transit schedule appeared. This is apparently tied to the fact that the main BusPlus validator (located near the driver's seat) instructed the driver on the schedule. Those validators were also removed following the contract termination.

== Vehicle coloring ==
Until the beginning of the 1960s, the vehicles have been colored by cream and red color scheme (buses have been colored until 1961. trolleybuses and trams are colored until 1964). From the beginning of the 1960s, the vehicles have been colored by Mussolini livery – light and dark green color scheme (for buses from 1961 to 1967, for trolleybuses and trams from 1964 to 1970).

From the end of the 1960s, the vehicles have been colored by cream and green color scheme (for trams and trolleybuses from 1968 to 1979, for buses from 1969 to 1987). From the end of the 1970s, the vehicles have been colored by cream and red color scheme again (for trams and trolleybuses from 1979 to 2003, for buses from 1987 to 2004).

From the beginning of the 2000s, the vehicles are coloring by three color schemes with blue bottom (trams are colored by red and blue color scheme from 2002, trolleybuses are colored by orange and blue color scheme from 2003 (for some units, but their current color scheme is red from 2010), and buses were colored by yellow and blue color scheme from 2004 until mid-2010s. The current scheme of the buses is red, which was introduced in 2014-15, along with blue scheme, which was introduced in December 2023, with line 601 becoming the first line to be operated using these buses, with more lines beginning operations with blue-schemed buses in 2024. The blue scheme doesn't have the GSP logo, and it replaces with "Beograd" sign, and coat and arms of the city. Some vehicles have been colored by cream and blue color scheme (like the private buses in the end of the 1990s, for example: one trolleybus ZiU-9 and one tram ČKD-Tatra KT4YU have been colored in cream and blue color scheme in 1993 (in collaboration with Mašinska Industrija Niš - MIN), and two trams ČKD-Tatra KT4YU have been coloured in cream and blue colour scheme in 2001).

== Vehicle fleet ==
=== Current fleet ===
==== Buses ====
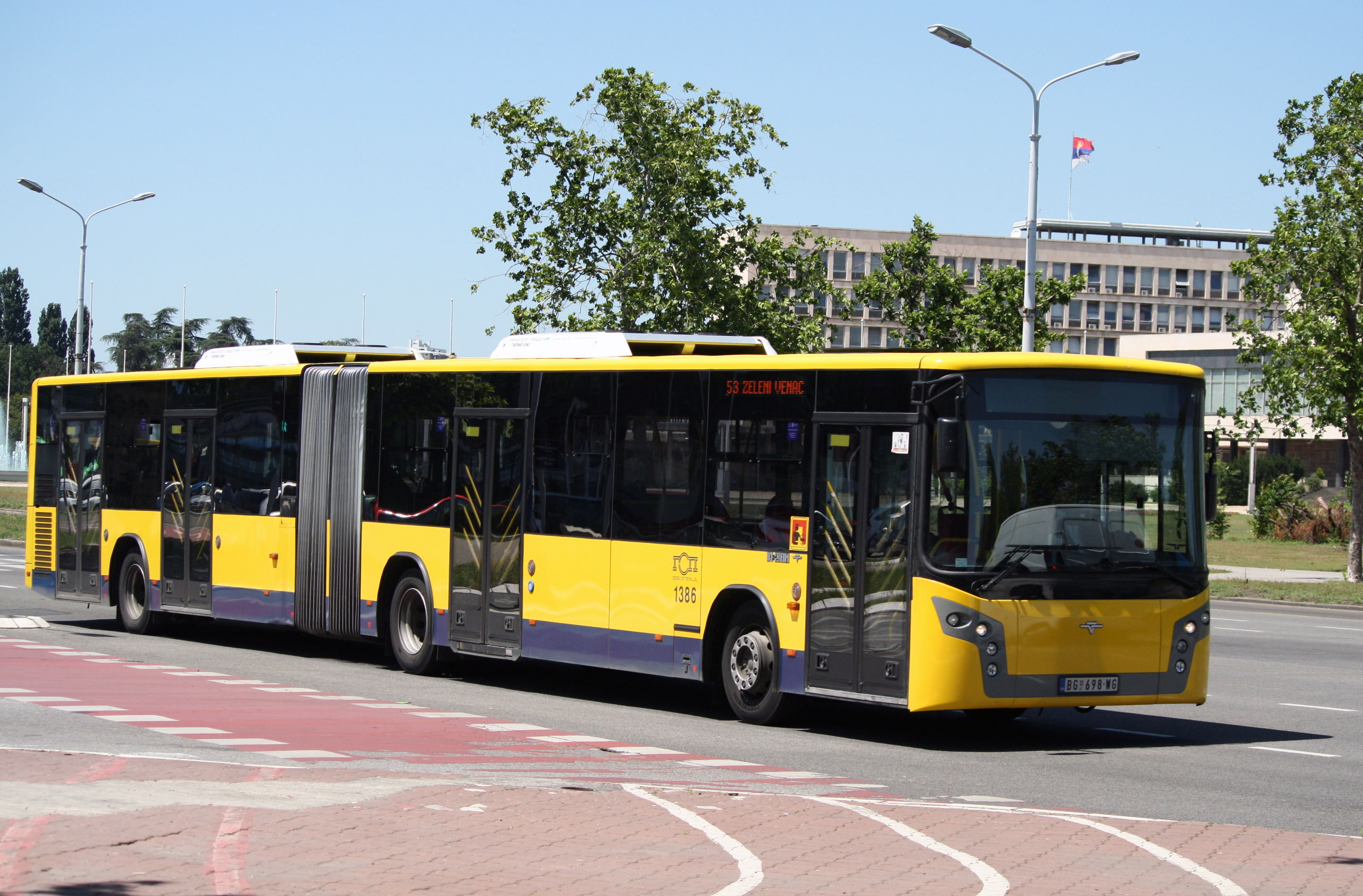
IK-218M are the latest model made by Ikarbus.

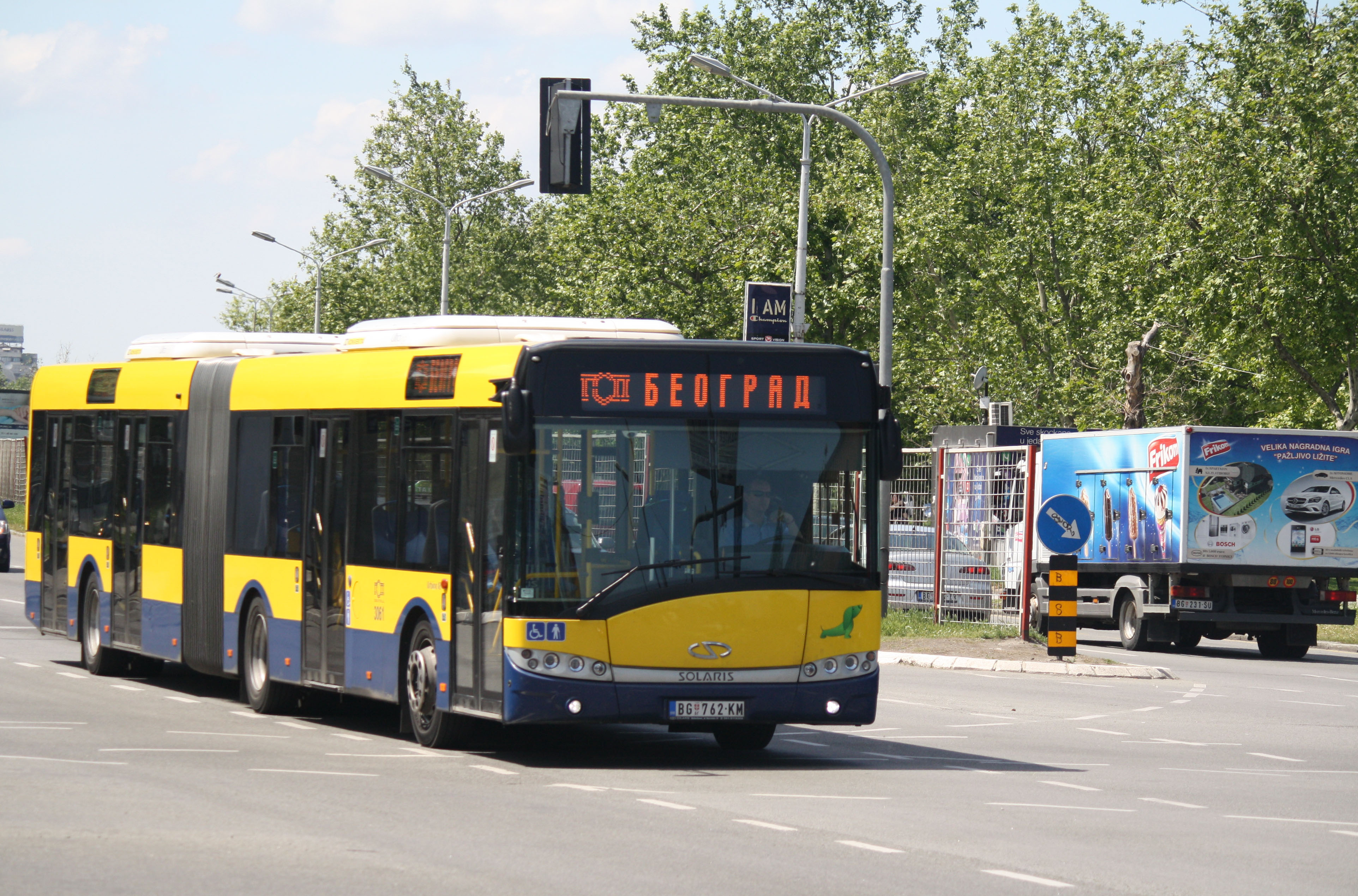
200 Solaris Urbino 18 were purchased as major modernization of GSP bus fleet.

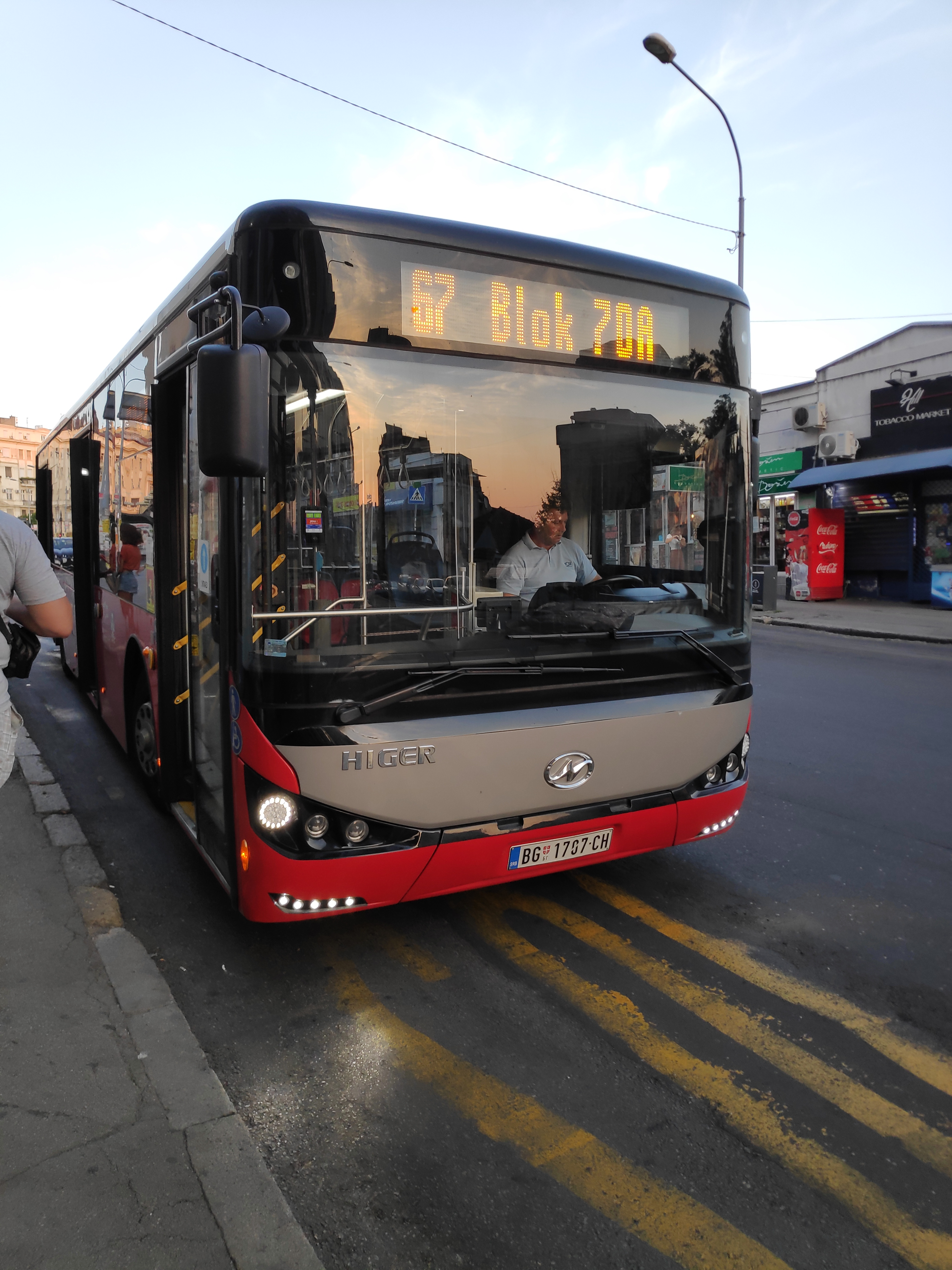
Chinese Higer bus; 174 were purchased in 2019

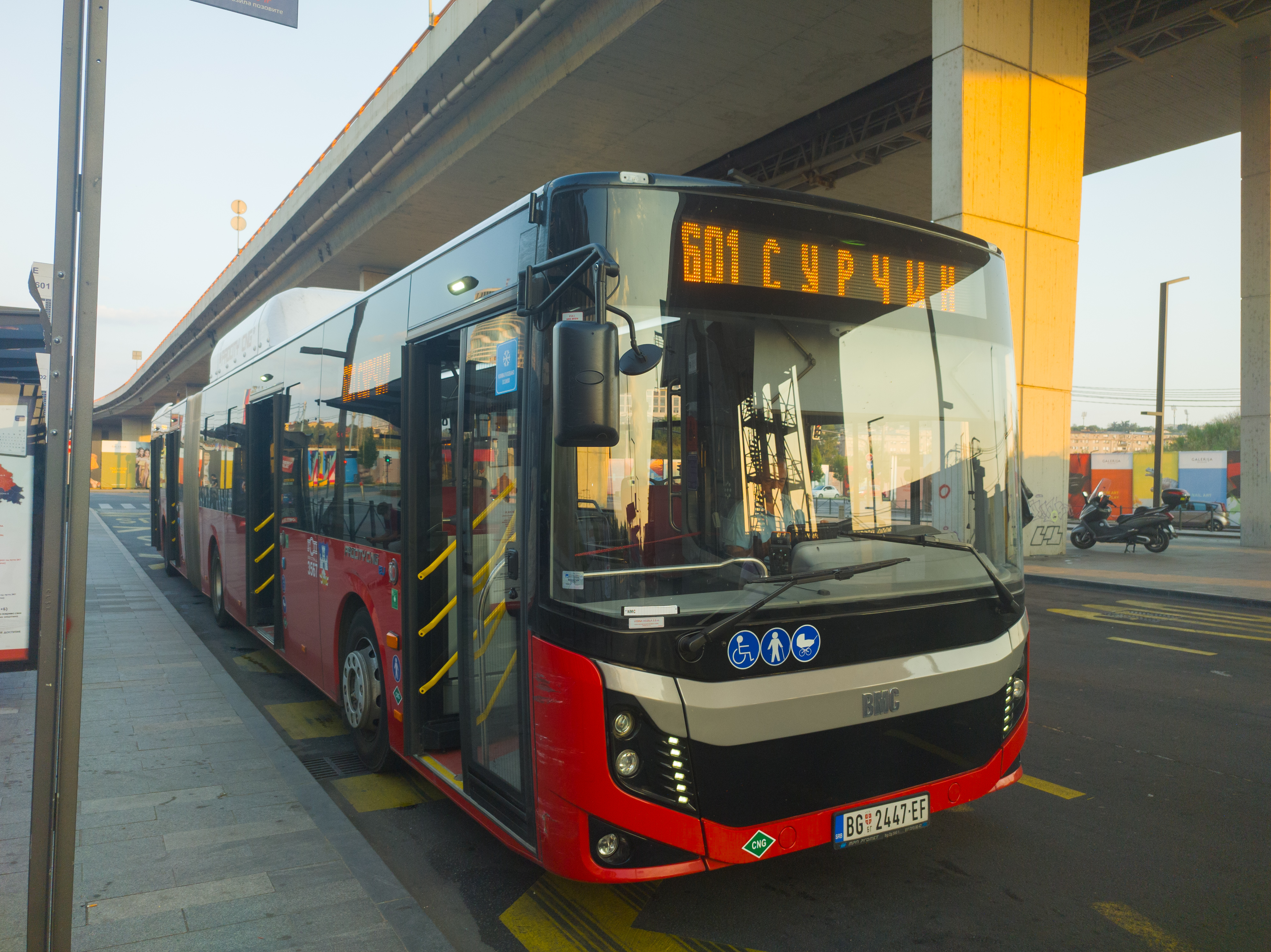
BMC Procity 18 CNG on the line 601. Now they are one of the most numerous models in the city.

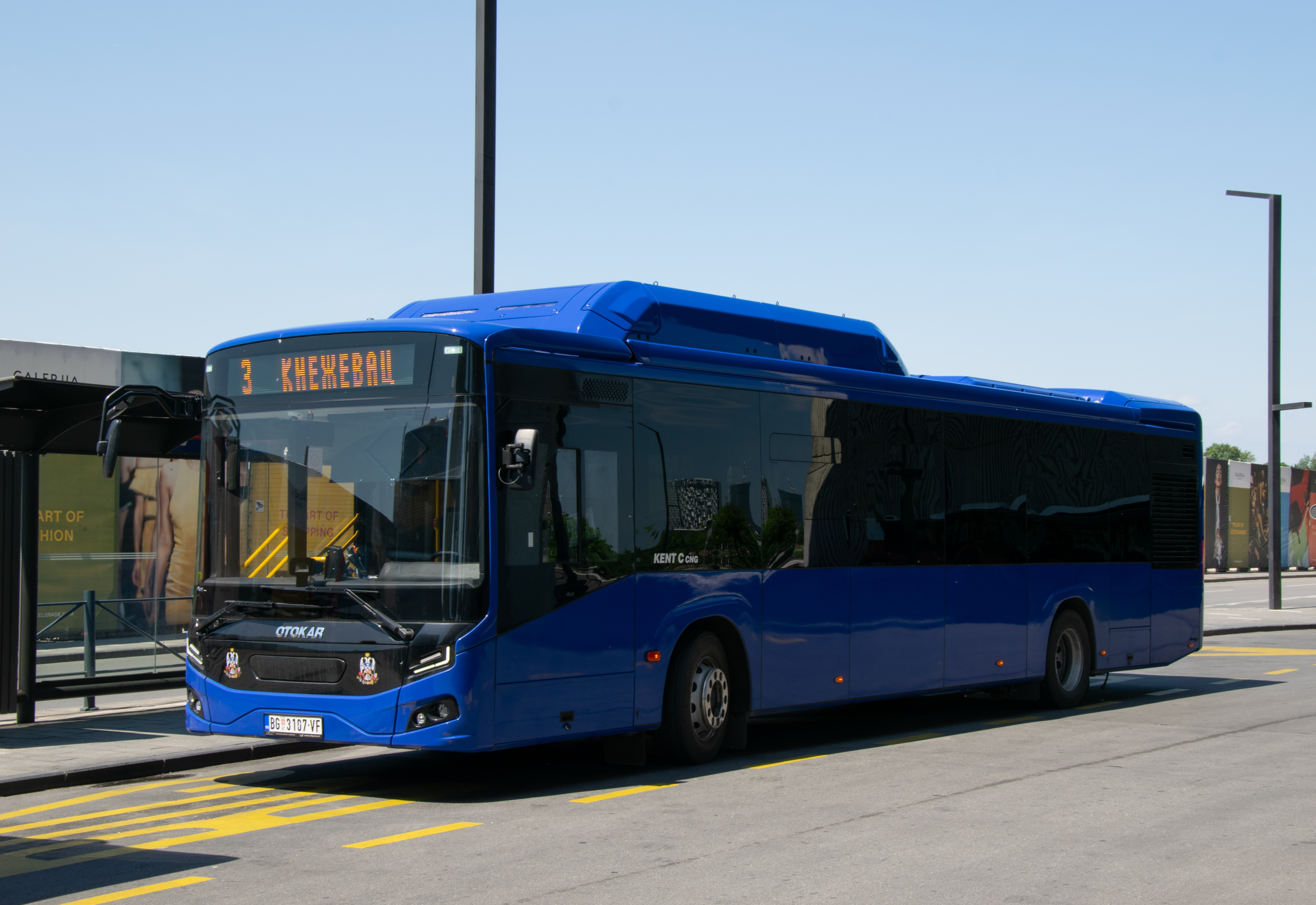
Otokar Kent C CNG on the line 3A. This is the latest model of solo buses in the city, bought for GSP.

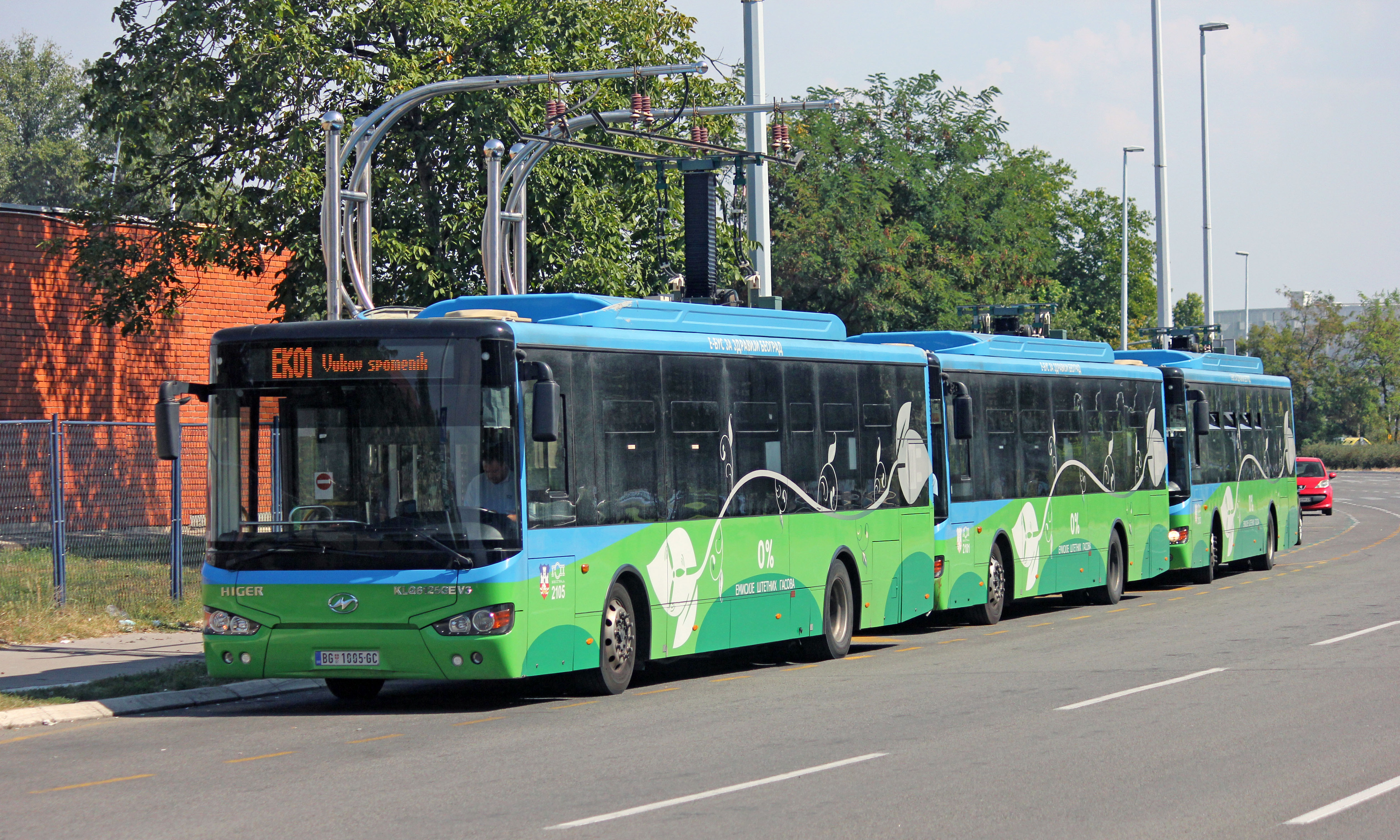
First electric bus in Belgrade Higer KLQ6129GEV2

Manufacturer	Model	Since	Type
BMC	Procity 12	2019	Solo
BMC	Procity 18 CNG	2022	Articulated
Higer	KLQ6129GQ2	2019	Solo
Higer	KLQ6129GEV2	2016	Electric
Higer	KLQ6129GEV3	2022	Electric
Ikarbus	IK-103	1998	Solo
Ikarbus	IK-112N	2008	Solo
Ikarbus	IK-112LE	2015	Solo
Ikarbus	IK-112M	2016	Solo
Ikarbus	IK-201	1997	Articulated
Ikarbus	IK-218	2011	Articulated
Ikarbus	IK-218N	2009	Articulated
Ikarbus	IK-218M	2012	Articulated
Mercedes-Benz	O345 Conecto	2003	Solo
MAZ/BIK	MAZ-203 CNG	2010	Solo
Otokar	Kent C 12 CNG	2025	Solo
Solaris	Urbino 18	2013	Articulated

==== Trolleybuses ====
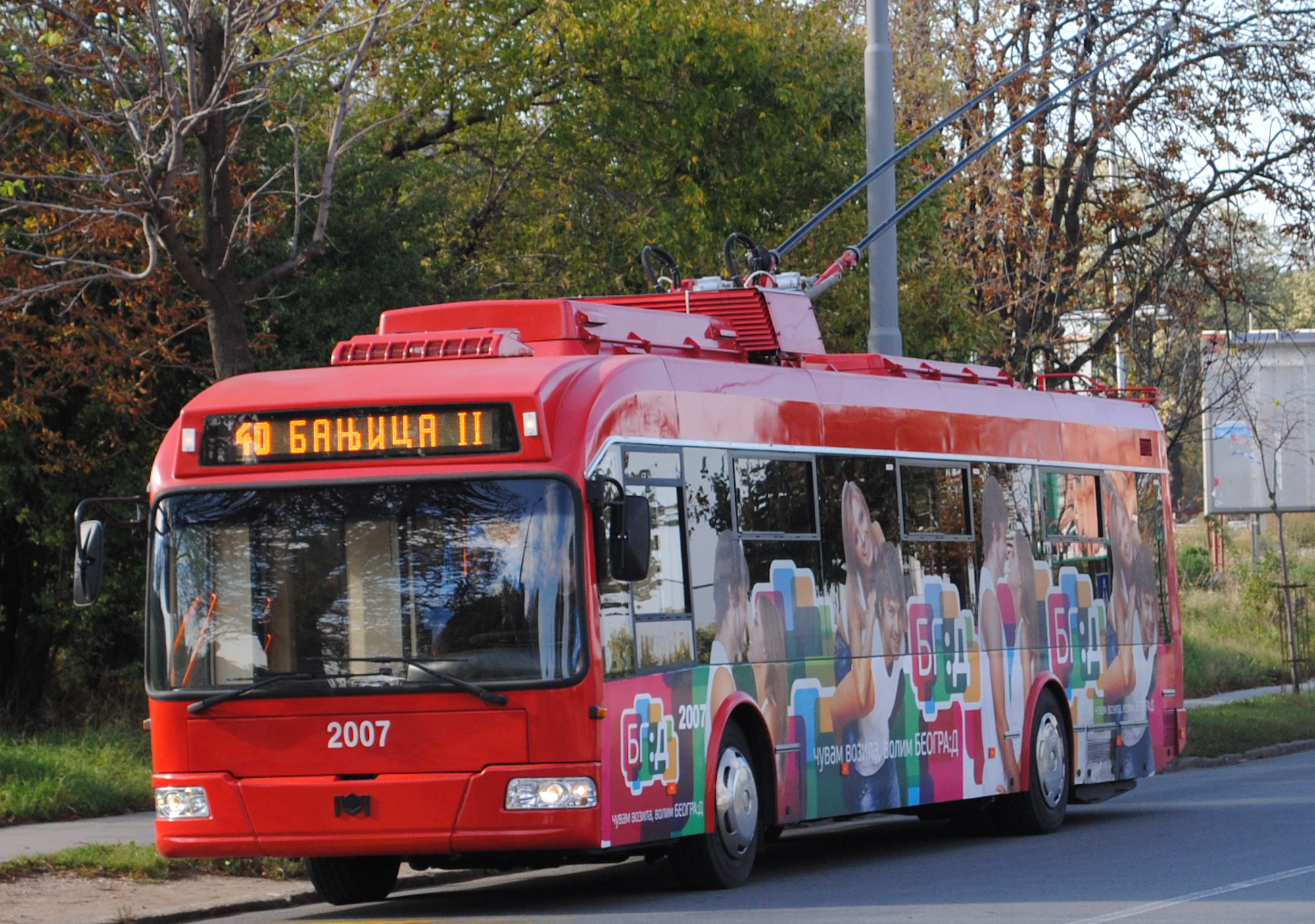
The GSP trolleybus fleet is the youngest, most consisting of Belkommunmash models AKSM-321 and AKSM-333 (from 2010).

Manufacturer	Model	Since	Type
Belkommunmash	AKSM-321.00S	2005	Solo
Belkommunmash	AKSM-333.04	2004	Articulated

Trams

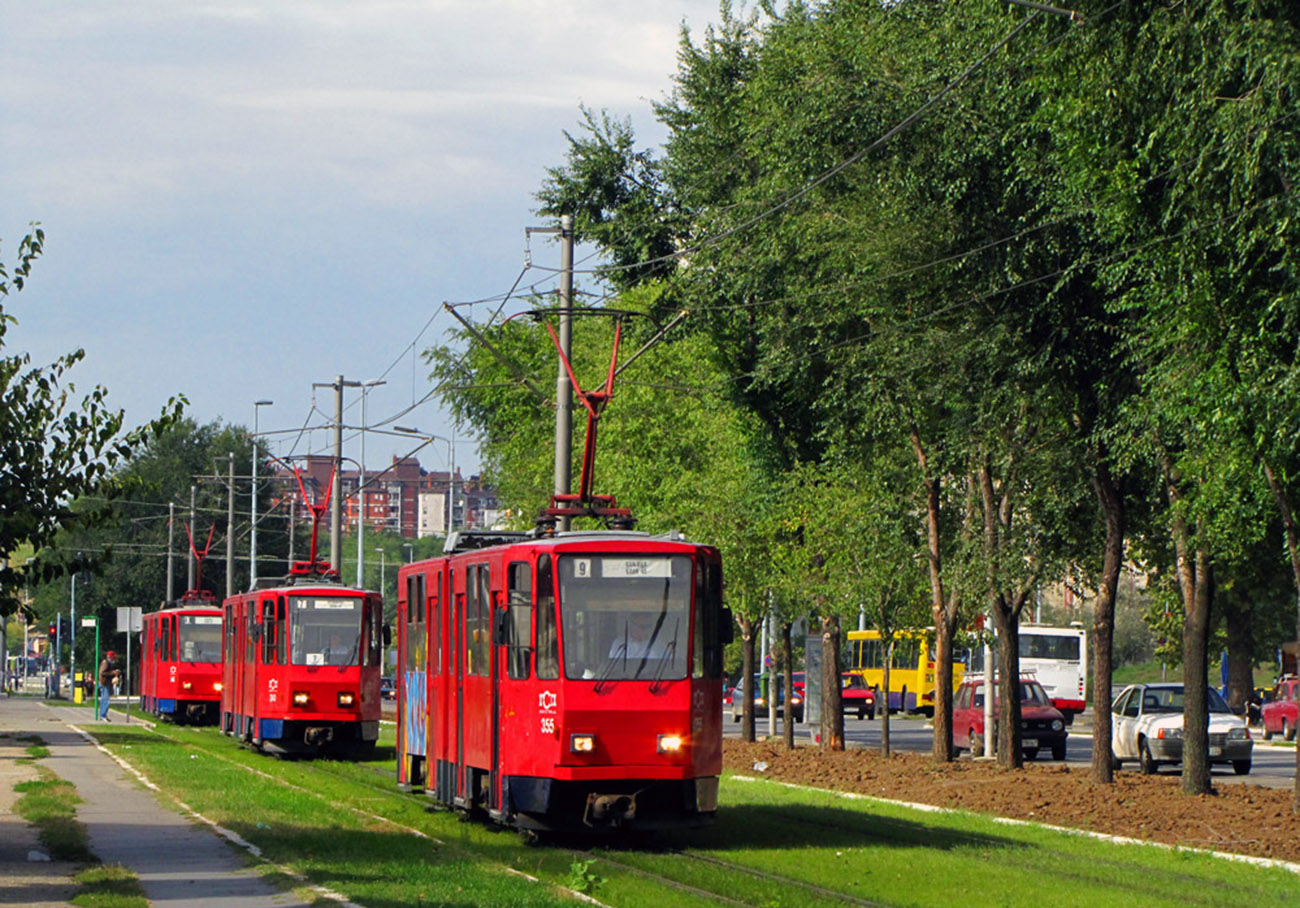
ČKD Tatra KT4 trams.

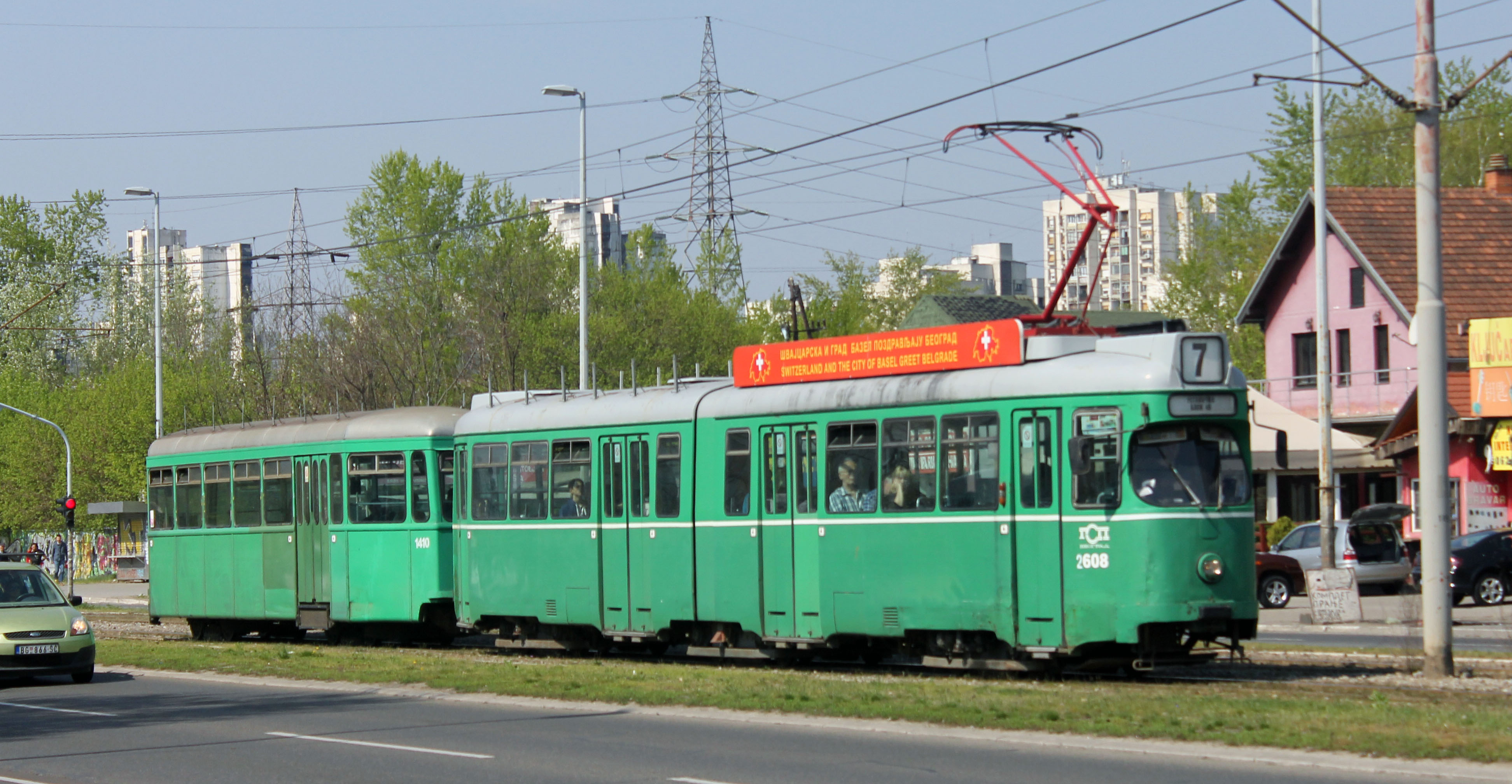
Duewag tram which Basel donated to Belgrade

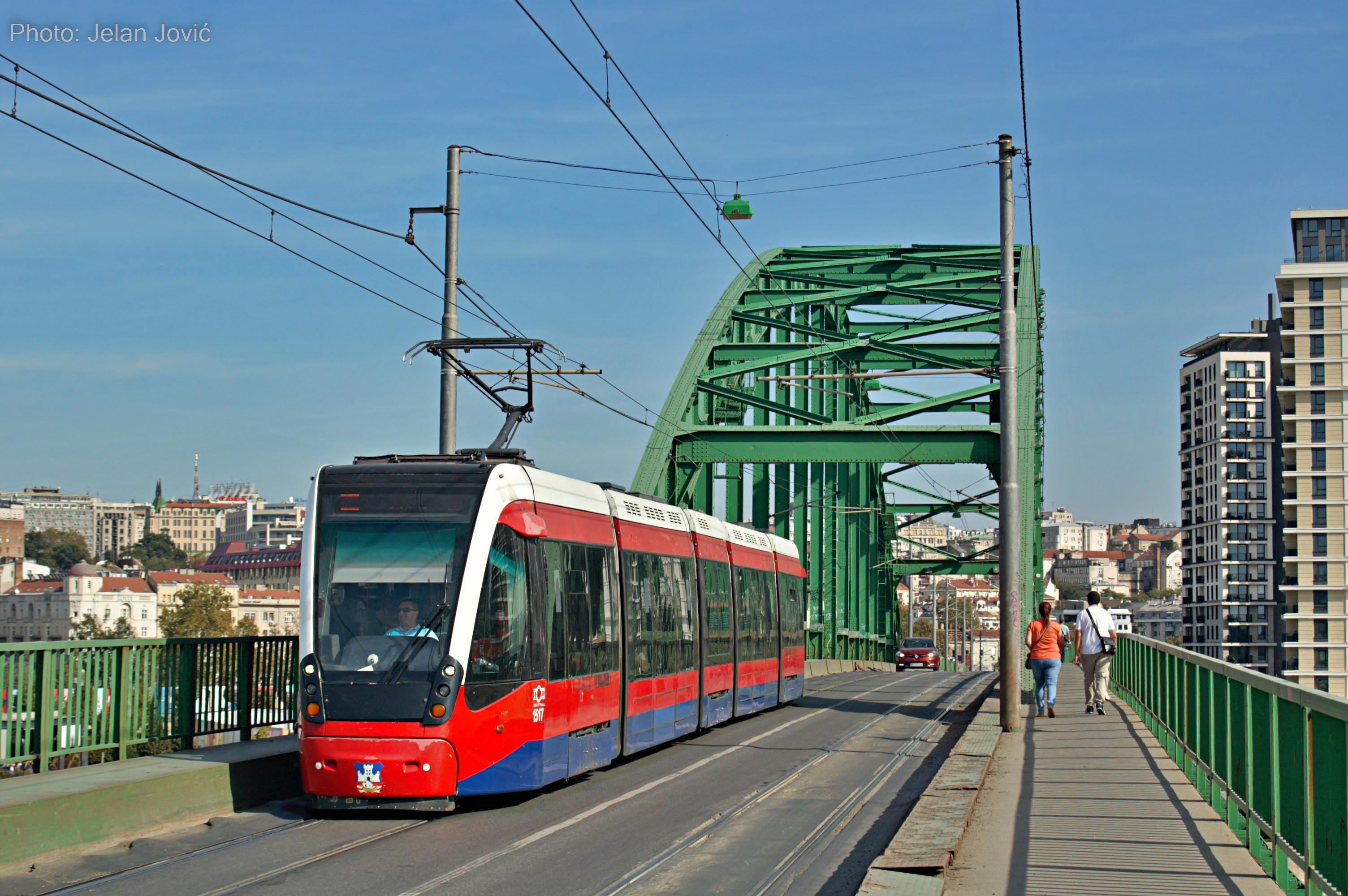
CAF Urbos 3 crossing former Old Sava Bridge

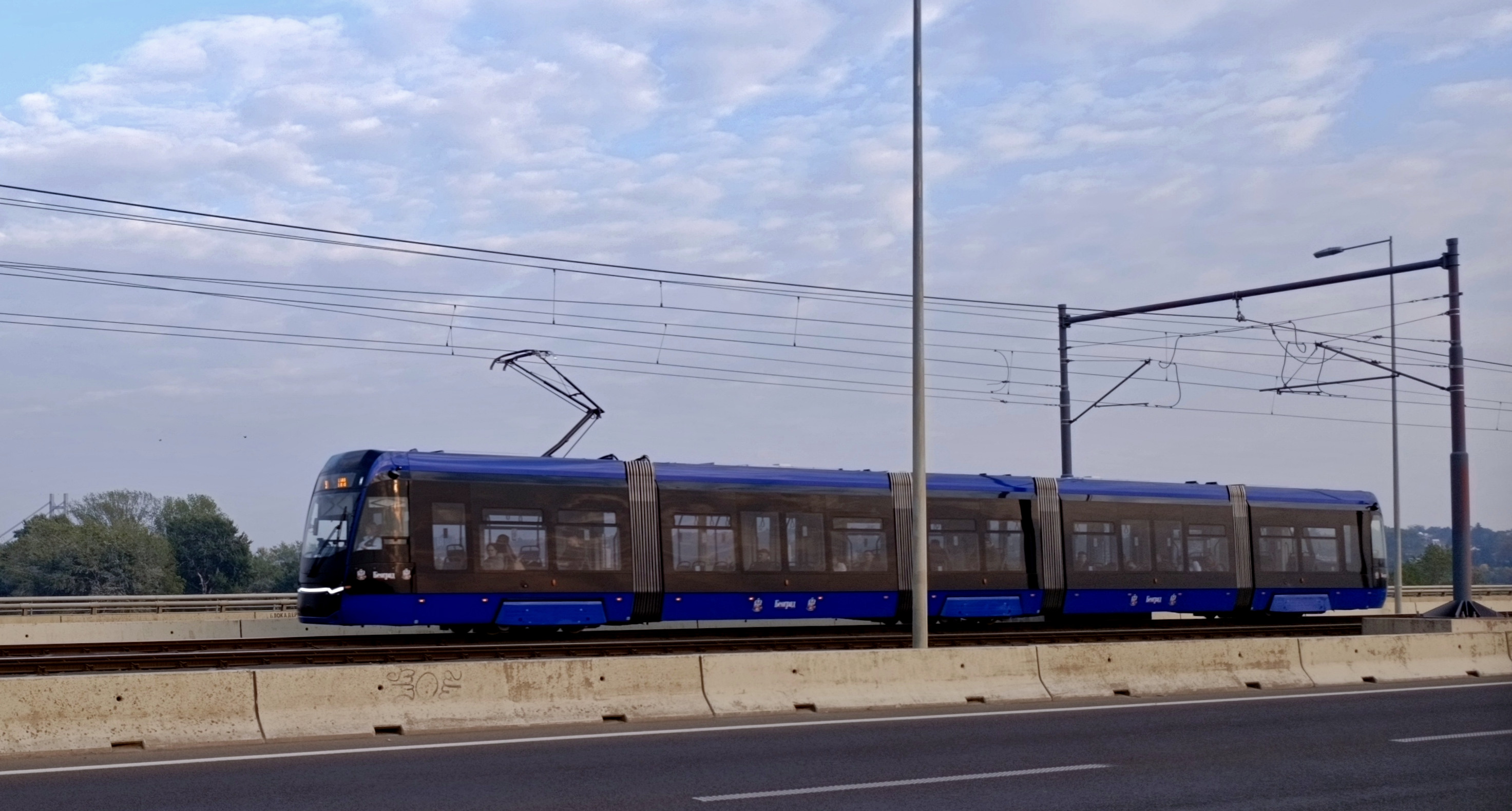
Turkish Bozankaya tram crossing Ada Bridge

Manufacturer	Model	Since	Type	Number	Note
ČKD	Tatra KT4	1980	Articulated	114	
Duewag	GT6 (Be 4/6)	2001	Articulated	31	Donation from Basel (Switzerland)
CAF	Urbos 3	2011	Low floor articulated	30	
Bozankaya	N/A	2025	Low floor articulated	25	

=== Vehicles used in the past ===
==== Buses ====
- Past buses
  - Mercedes-Benz O317K FAS "11 Oktomvri" Skoplje (1973–1990) – solo – 17 years
  - Mercedes-Benz O305G (2000–2003) – donation from Germany – articulated – 3 years
  - Mercedes-Benz O405 (2000-2019) - donation from Germany - solo - 19 years
  - Mercedes-Benz O405N (2000-2017) - donation from Germany - solo - 17 years
  - Mercedes-Benz O405G (2000–2012) – donation from Germany – articulated – 12 years
  - FAS-Sanos S115 (1987–2012) – solo – 25 years
  - FAS-Sanos S200 (2000–2003) – donation from Ljubljana (Slovenia) – articulated – 3 years
  - MAN Avtomontaža 890 UO (1974–1985) – solo – 11 years
  - MAN Avtomontaža 890 UG (1970–1981) – articulated – 11 years
  - MAN 890 UO Ikarus Zemun IK-6B (1970–1987) – solo – 18 years
  - MAN 890 UG Ikarus Zemun IK-5B (1975–1994) – articulated – 19 years
  - MAN Avtomontaža SU 220 (1981–2007) – solo – 26 years
  - MAN Avtomontaža SG 220 (1987–2003) – articulated – 16 years
  - Ikarus IK-4B (1971–1990) – solo – 19 years
  - Ikarus IK-105B (1982–2000) – solo – 18 years
  - Ikarus IK-102 (1988–2014) – solo – 24 years
  - Ikarus IK-110B (1984–2013) – solo – 29 years
  - Ikarus IK-111B (1989–2017) - solo - 20 years
  - Ikarus IK-111 (1990–2000) – donation from Kyiv (Ukraine) – solo – 10 years
  - Ikarus IK-160B (1984–2013) – articulated – 28 years
  - Ikarus IK-161 (1986–2014) – articulated – 28 years
  - Ikarus IK-166 (1991–2014) – articulated – 23 years
  - Ikarus IK-166 (1994–2013) – donation from Istanbul (Turkey) – articulated – 19 years
  - Ikarus IK-167 (1990–2003) – articulated – 13 years
  - FAP-Leyland Kokarus (1963–1982) – solo – 19 years
  - FAP G100 (1968–1981) – solo – 13 years
  - FAP G160 (1968–1980) – articulated – 12 years
  - FAP A537 (2002–2020) – solo – 18 years
  - TAM AS 3500 (1968–1981) – solo – 13 years
  - Leyland Worldmaster (1961–1977) – solo – 16 years
  - MAN NL202 (2000–2013) – donation from Germany – solo – 13 years
  - Fiat Iveco (2000–2009) – donation from Trieste (Italy) – solo – 9 years
  - Graf-Stift GU 230 (2000–2004) – donation from Austria – articulated – 4 years
  - Ikarus 260 (2000–2002) – donation from Greece – solo – 2 years
  - Karosa B932E (2000-2020) - donation from Czech Republic - solo - 20 years
  - MAN SL 283 (2003-2020) - donation from Japan - solo - 17 years
  - MAN SG 313 (2003-2024) - donation from Japan - articulated - 21 years

==== Trolleybuses ====
- Past trolleybuses
  - Alfa Romeo / Goša (1962–1984) – solo – 22 years
  - Goša Fages (1956–1981) – solo – 25 years
  - Goša Prototype (1987–1995) – solo – 8 years
  - Fiat CGE (1949–1980) – solo – 31 years
  - Tatra T400 (1947–1961) – solo – 14 years
  - ZiU 9 (1979–2012) – solo – 33 years
  - ZiU 682G (1989–2015) - solo - 26 years
  - ZiU 682B-10 (2005–2010) – donation from Athens (Greece) – solo – 5 years
  - Trolza 5275-05 (2003–2010) – solo – 7 years
  - VMZ 5298(375) (2000–2010) – solo – 10 years
  - Belkommunmash AKSM 201.01 (2001–2016) - solo – 15 years
  - Graf-Stift OE112 M11 (2001–2007) – donation from Austria – solo – 6 years
  - Graf-Stift OE112 M16 (2001–2010) – donation from Austria – articulated – 9 years

==== Trams ====
- Past trams
  - Đuro Đaković TMK 101 (1964–1980) – solo – 16 years
  - Đuro Đaković TMK 201 Prototype (1967–1983) – solo – 16 years
  - Đuro Đaković TMK 201 (1970–1991) – solo – 21 years
  - ČKD Tatra T4D Prototype (1967–1983) – solo – 16 years
  - ČKD Tatra T4YUB (1972–1991) – solo – 19 years
  - Breda I (1940–1970) – solo – 30 years
  - Breda II (1949–1974) – solo – 25 years
  - Breda III 5300 (1960–1985) – solo – 25 years
  - PCC I (700) – from Belgium (1952–1981) – solo – 29 years
  - PCC II (B6) – from Belgium (1960–1985) – solo – 25 years
  - Jasenica – from Goša or Đuro Đaković (1936–1980) – solo – 44 years
  - Duewag T4 – Hagen (1977–1986) – solo (bi-directional) – 9 years
  - Duewag GT6 – Hagen (1978–1987) – articulated (bi-directional) – 9 years
  - Goša (1956–1968) – solo – 12 years
  - MAN-Siemens Shuckert (1923–1960) – solo – 37 years
  - AEG (1923–1971) – solo – 48 years
  - Škoda / Kolben Ringhofer (1927–1967) – solo – 40 years
  - BBC – Brown, Boveri & Cie (1927–1964) – solo – 37 years
