= TMK 201 =

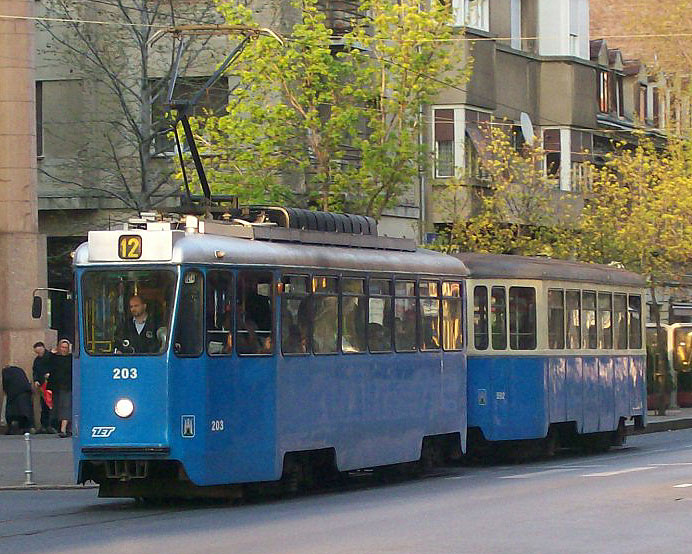
- TMK 201 type in Zagreb
- In service: 1974–2025
- Manufacturer: Đuro Đaković
- Constructed: 1973–1975
- Number built: 30
- Predecessor: TMK 101
- Successor: TMK 2100
- Operators: ZET; GSP Belgrade

Specifications
- Train length: 14 m (46 ft)
- Width: 2.20 m (7.2 ft)
- Height: 3.16 m (10.4 ft)
- Doors: 3
- Maximum speed: 56 km/h (35 mph)
- Track gauge: 1,000 mm (3 ft 3 3/8 in)

TMK 201 was a type of four-axle tramcar produced by the Đuro Đaković factory (from Slavonski Brod) that mainly operated in Zagreb, the capital of Croatia. Previously, it was also used in Belgrade from 1970 to 1991. The first tram of this type was received by ZET (the public transportation company in Zagreb) on 31 December 1973, and the thirtieth-and-last of the type was delivered in June 1974. The new tram model was first put in service on 22 January 1974. Four vehicles remained actively involved in the transport of passengers, and some were used for the production of TMK 2100 in the 1990s. The last two vehicles completed their service for lines 2 and 12 on 13 June 2025, then the next day for line 11; the last day of service was 15 June on line 9. They were replaced by new TMK 2400 trams.

== Technical ==
The tram was 14 meters long, a few meters longer than the TMK 101 and with more input power. Its maximum speed was 58 km/h.
