= Borongaj =

Neighbourhood in Zagreb, Croatia

- Neighbourhood
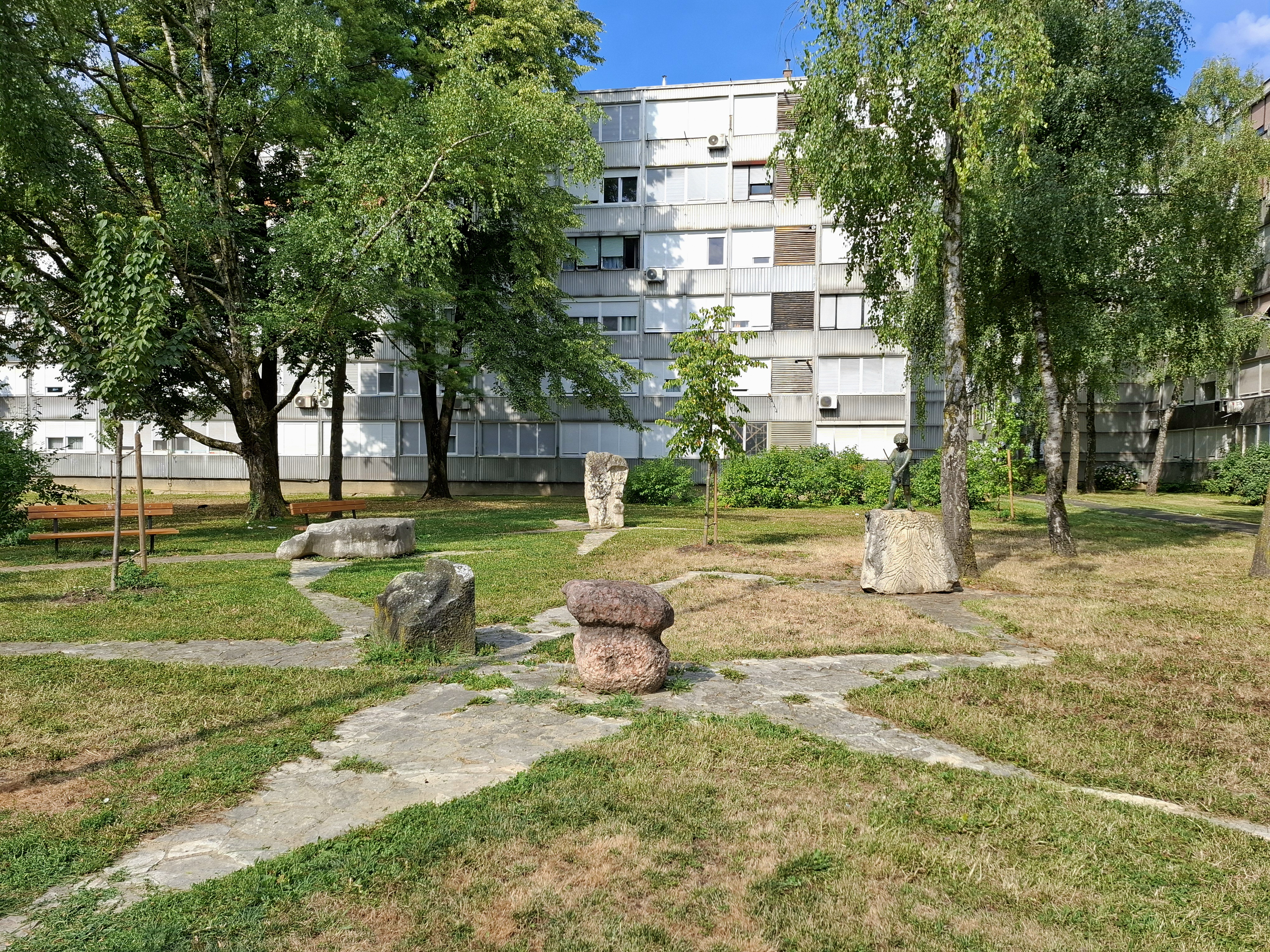
- Little Prince park
- Interactive map of Borongaj
- Coordinates: 45°48′46″N 16°1′36″E
- Country: Croatia
- Region: Central Croatia
- City: Zagreb
- District: Peščenica – Žitnjak

Area
  - Total: 68.7 ha (170 acres)

Population (2021)
  - Total: 4,394

Borongaj is a neighbourhood in the Peščenica – Žitnjak district of Zagreb, Croatia. It is situated south of the main railway along Branimir Avenue and east of Donje Svetice Road. It is the location of the former Borongaj Airfield.

For administrative purposes, Borongaj is part of the "Bruno Bušić" local council. Covering an area of 68.7 hectares (170 acres), it is populated by 4,394 inhabitants (census 2021).
