= TMK 101 =

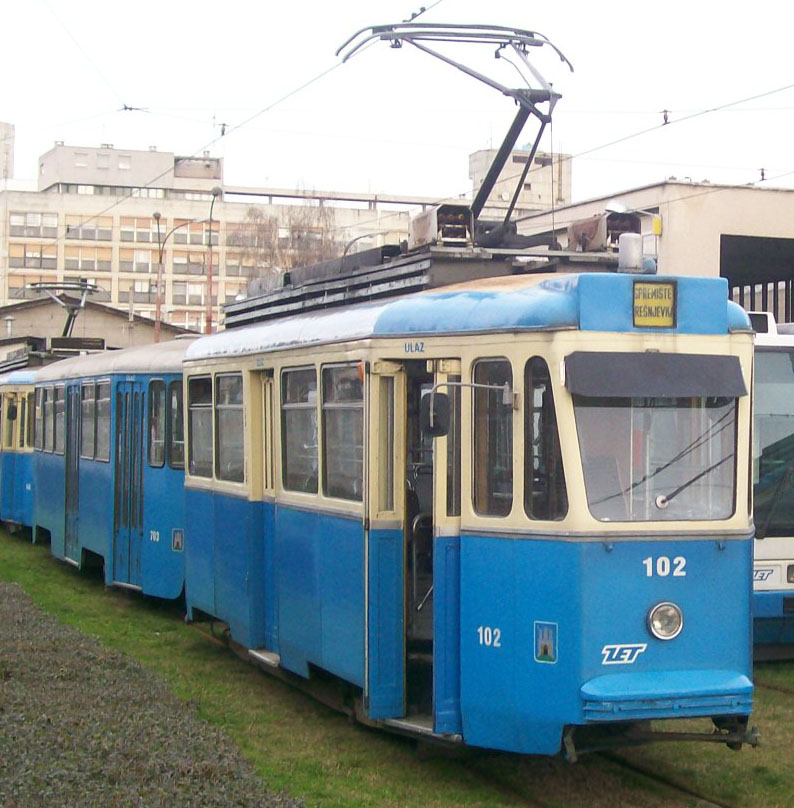
- TMK 101 in the Trešnjevka tram depot
- In service: 1951–2008
- Manufacturer: Đuro Đaković
- Constructed: 1951–1965
- Scrapped: 1990–2008
- Number built: 68 (Đuro Đaković) + 3 (ZET workshops)
- Number preserved: 4
- Predecessor: M-24
- Successor: TMK 201
- Capacity: 13 (seated); 42 (standing)
- Operators: ZET; GPP; GSP Belgrade
- Depots: Trešnjevka

Specifications
- Car length: 11 m (36 ft)
- Width: 2.2 m (7.2 ft)
- Doors: 3
- Maximum speed: 55 km/h (34 mph)
- Weight: 14.9 t (14.7 long tons; 16.4 short tons)
- Power output: 2×60 kW
- Electric system(s): Controller and resistors on the roof
- Current collection: Originally Bowcollector, Pantograph phased in from the early 1990s
- Braking system(s): Electomagnetic, air, track
- Track gauge: 1,000 mm (3 ft 3 3/8 in)

TMK 101 is a type of two-axle tramcar which was used in Zagreb (Croatia) from 1951 until December 2008, when the last vehicle of this type was withdrawn from regular service. They were single-ended (controls at one end only) and had all 3 doors on the right-hand side only, in conformity with standard Zagreb (ZET) operating practices. Maximum passenger capacity (crush load) was 95, and they were fitted with two electric motors rated with a total continuous power output of 120 kW which gave a maximum speed of 55 km/h. The TMK 101 was the first modern type of tram produced in Croatia, featuring automatic door openers, driver's and conductor's seats, electrical, air-operated, and mechanical brakes, and a protective windshield at the front. Couplings were provided for trailer operation.

Engineer Dragutin Mandl and his team of constructors in ZET's workshops finished constructing the first prototype, No. 101, on 4 April 1951. Three prototypes were made by ZET in their own workshops; Đuro Đaković's factory in Slavonski Brod was contracted to build the remaining 68 vehicles to ZET’s specifications, together with 110 matching trailers (which were numbered 591 to 700). Series production began in 1957, and continued until 1965. Another 32 trailers for the TMK 201 trams built from 1973 to 1974 could also be used by TMK 101 cars.

After withdrawal, a number of these trams were converted to service (non-passenger) vehicles. One car (prototype No. 101, together with matching trailer No. 592) has been retained by ZET as part of their historical fleet, and has been repainted in the historical blue and cream livery. Number 164 was sold to a private person, and at least two more were transformed into cargo and service trams.

A book written about this tram was called Tram 101: 1951-2008. (authors Dražen Bijelić and Željko Halambek).

Trams of this design have also been used in Osijek (from 1963 to 1981) and in Belgrade (from 1964 to 1980).

== Liveries ==
These trams have carried three different Yugoslav tramcar colour schemes, one for each of the different operators: in Zagreb they were cream-and-blue, in Osijek cream-and-red, and in Belgrade cream-and-green.
