= Sopot, Zagreb =

Neighbourhood in Zagreb, Croatia

Coordinates: 45°46.5′N 15°59.2′E

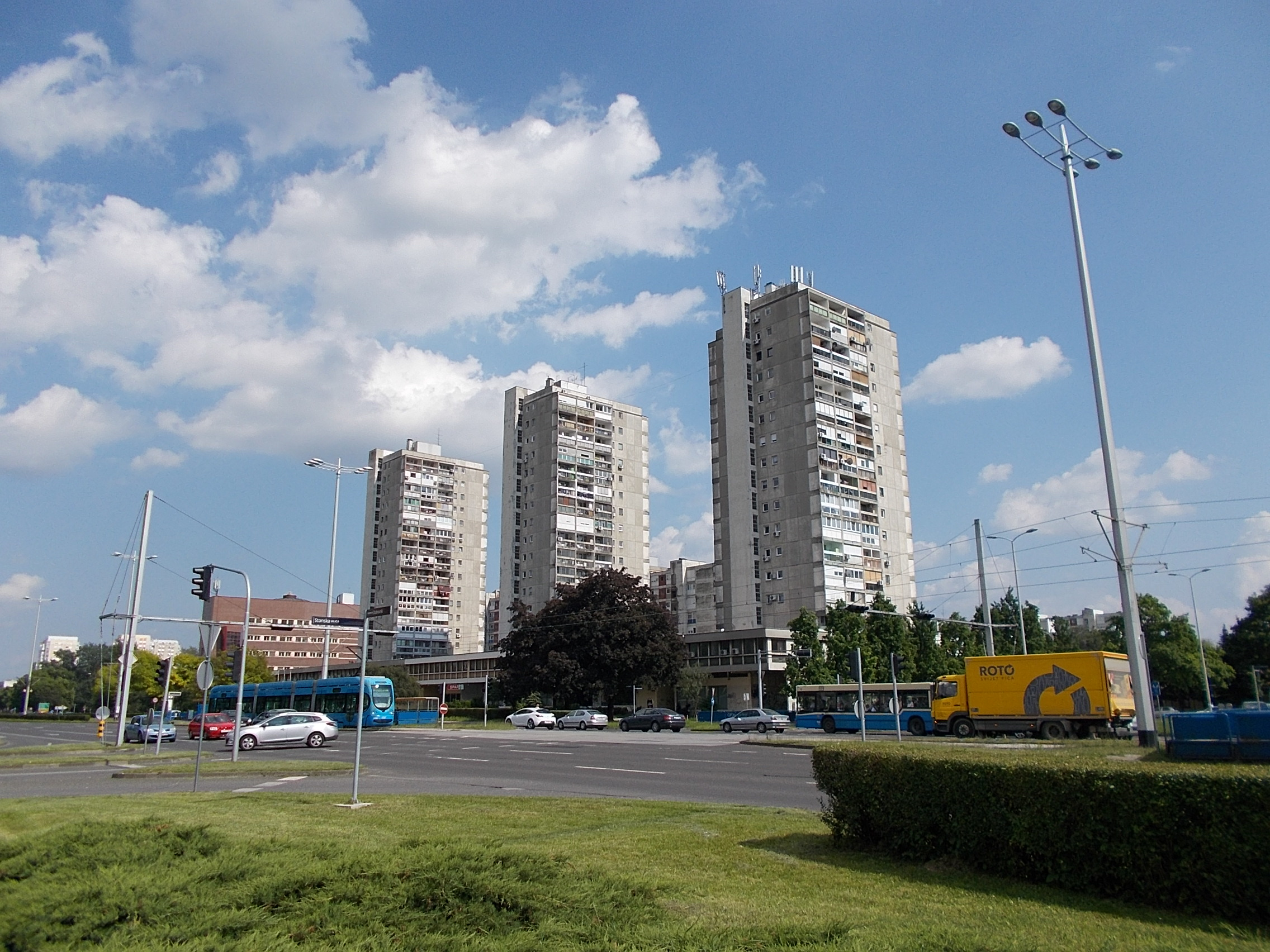
Buildings in Sopot, Novi Zagreb

Sopot is a residential neighbourhood in Zagreb, Croatia. It is part of the Novi Zagreb - istok district and it has a population of 7,428 (2011).

Sopot was one of the earliest parts of Novi Zagreb to be built. It consists almost entirely of tower blocks and blocks of flats, surrounded by birch trees and poplars.

The Zagreb tram route for Lines 7 and 14 runs along its northern edge, on Avenue Dubrovnik, and Line 6 has its turning point there.
