= Transport in Zagreb =

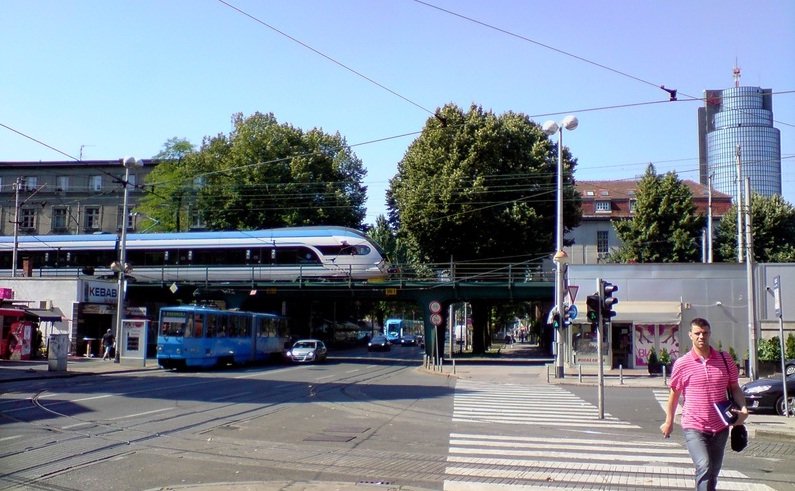
- A commuter train and a tram

Overview
- Locale: Zagreb metropolitan area
- Transit type: Commuter rail, trams, buses, private automobile, Taxicab, bicycle, pedestrian

Transport in Zagreb, the capital of Croatia, relies on a combination of city-managed mass transit and individual transportation. Mass transit is composed of 19 inner-city tram lines and 120 bus routes, both managed entirely by Zagreb Electric Tram, commonly abbreviated to ZET. Croatian Railways manages the parallel commuter rail system.

The city is served by the Franjo Tuđman Airport, which carries more than 4.7 million passengers per year. Zagreb Airport is connected to the Zagreb Bus Station via Pleso Prijevoz shuttle and to Eugen Kvaternik Square via bus line 290 which connects the aforementioned square with the satellite city of Velika Gorica via the airport. Zagreb has two unimodal long distance terminals, one for railways (Zagreb Glavni kolodvor) and the second one for buses (Zagreb Bus Station), both situated in the city centre.

== History ==
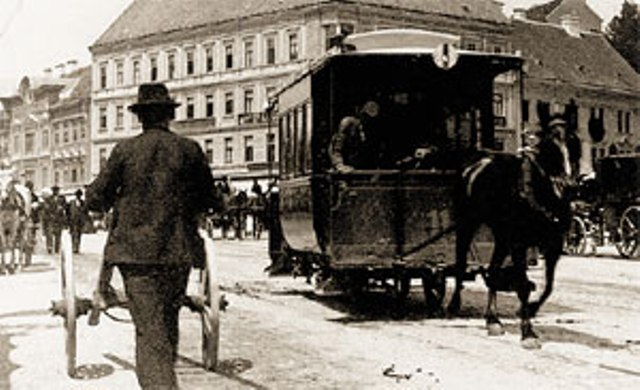
Horse-drawn tramway in 1888s

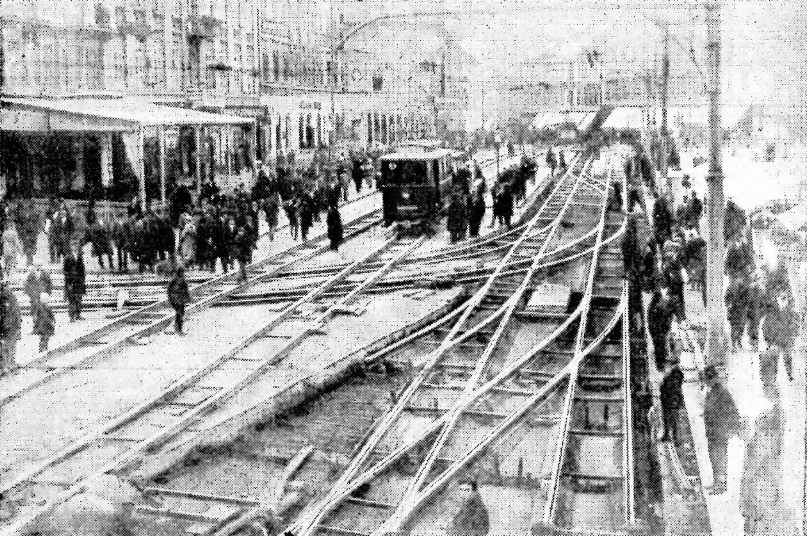
Railwork on Jelačić Square, 1924

Public transport in Zagreb has evolved alongside the city’s rapid urban and industrial development since the late 19th century. The first organized system began in 1891 with a horse-drawn tramway, which was eventually when Zagreb Electric Tram was founded. The tram was soon electrified in 1910, marking a major step toward modernization. Throughout the early 20th century, the tram network expanded significantly, becoming the backbone of urban mobility and shaping the city’s spatial growth. The location of the Technical Museum is an important place in the history of ZET because it was the first depot and the place from which, as he stated, on September 5, 1891, the driver Ferdo, accompanied by the conductor Vid and the harnessed horse Belko, set off on his journey along the tracks, then eight kilometers long, at a speed of 7.5 kilometres per hour (4.7 mph).

After World War II, Zagreb invested heavily in public transport infrastructure, introducing bus services to complement tram lines and connect newly developed suburban areas. During the socialist period, the system was characterized by centralized planning and steady expansion, while the late 20th and early 21st centuries brought modernization efforts, including fleet upgrades and improved service integration. Today, Zagreb’s public transport system, primarily consisting of trams and buses, remains a vital component of daily life, reflecting both its historical legacy and ongoing adaptation to contemporary urban needs.

== Road transport ==
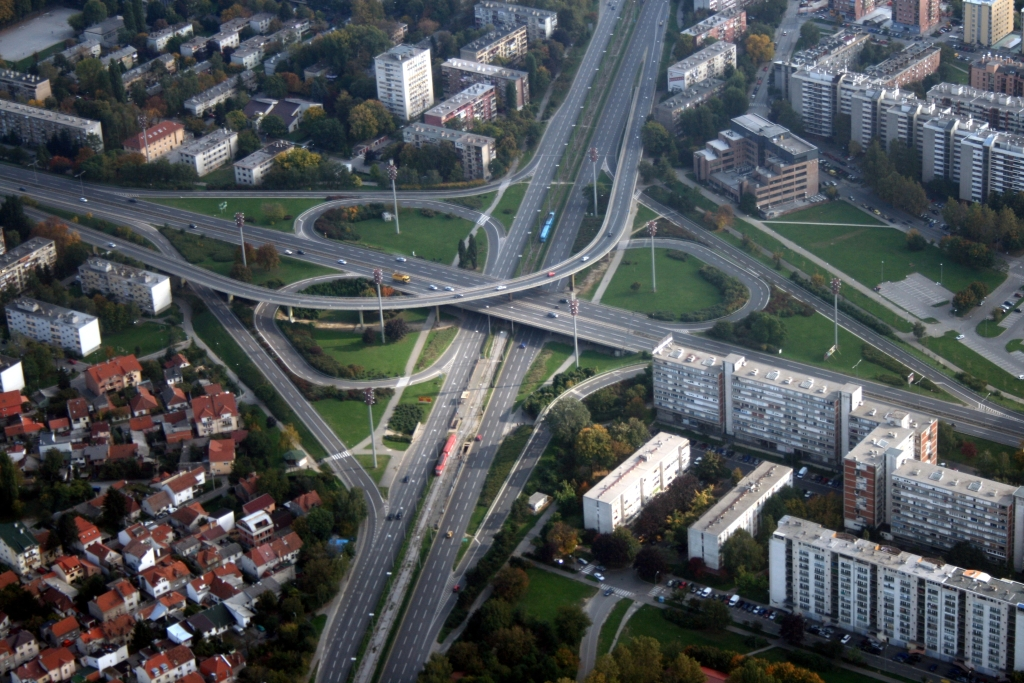
Marin Držić and Slavonska Avenues interchange (so-called "Petlja")

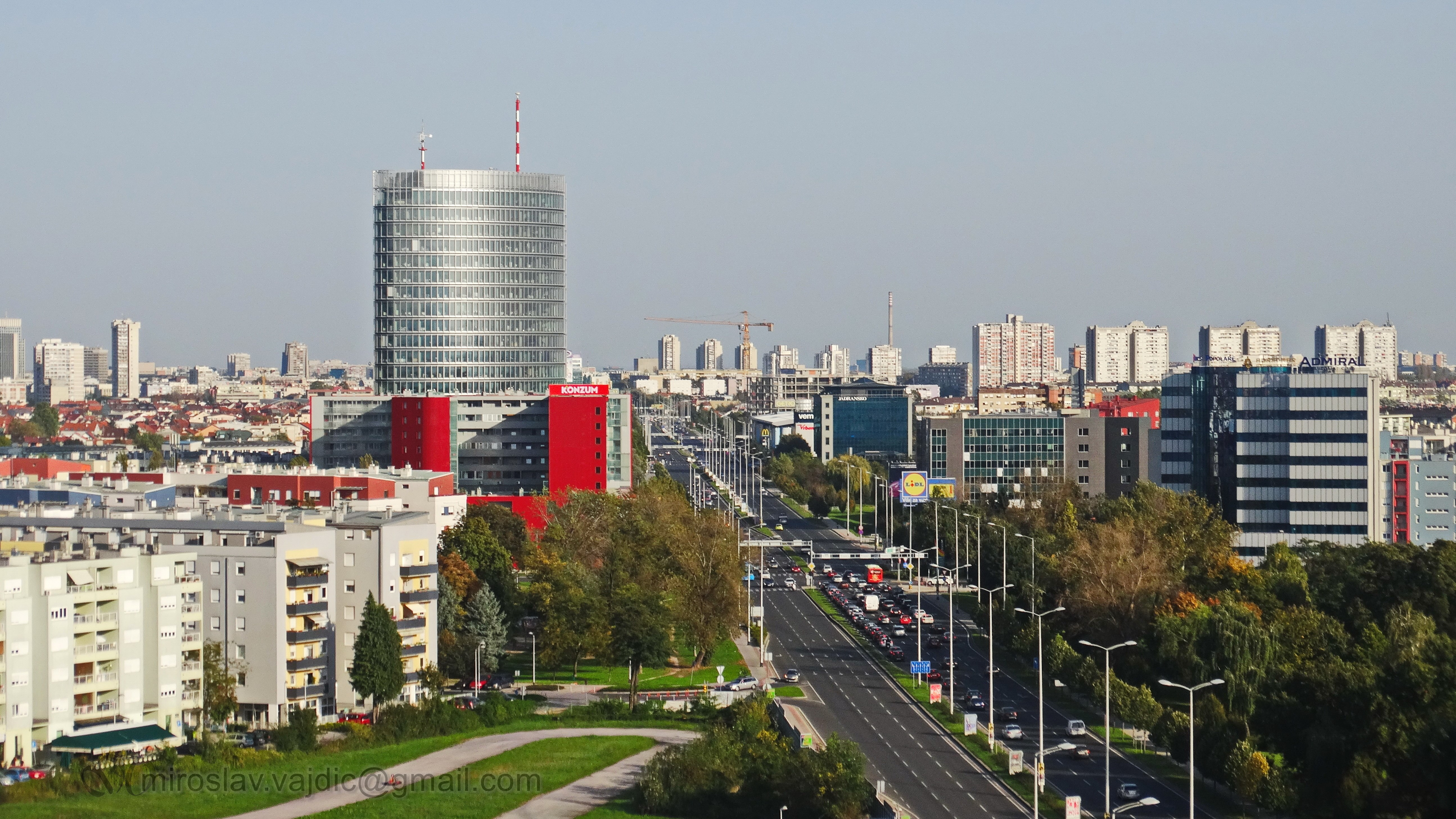
Zagrebačka Avenue

Zagreb drivers typically use a wide network of avenues and other arterial streets. Due to the shape of the city, most of the trips done in the city are on the east-west relation, causing high traffic on roads like Vukovar Avenue, Dubrovnik Avenue and Zagrebačka Avenue. The 18-kilometer (11 mi) Slavonska Avenue is the longest and one of the most congested roads in Zagreb, connecting the inner city to the A3 highway in the east. The number of registered motorized vehicles in the city in the timespan from 1995 to 2006 has increased by 117% (from around 175 thousand vehicles to around 385 thousand), which when adding into account the number of vehicles from the surrounding counties that transit through the city on a daily basis brings the estimated daily number of vehicles in the city to 520 thousand. Compared to its population, Zagreb has more motorized vehicles than Vienna. In 1990 there were 166 cars per 1000 people in Croatia, in 2012 that number increased to 339‰, and in 2022 there were 491 cars per thousand inhabitants (an increase of 45% compared to 2012), marking the 2nd largest growth of car ownership in the EU, after Romania. Zagreb is struggling with the road infrastructure and the number of available parking spaces being insufficient to meet the demand of such an increase in car ownership. The city, nonetheless, has more parking spaces per capita in the city center than Stockholm, Amsterdam and Vienna; however, it lacks a developed park and ride system. Similar to other European cities, Zagreb does not feature a regular grid plan. Donji Grad, the Zagreb downtown, mostly built in the 19th century, features a quasi-rectangular street plan, but the rest of the city depends on the form of wide straight avenues intersecting densely built neighborhoods composed of mostly chaotical street systems. Summer months are commonly used to repair road infrastructure across the city, due to many of the city residents leaving on holiday leave, thus reducing the load of vehicles and subsequent traffic congestion which would ensue due to roadworks.

Zagreb is a regional highway hub with eight highways and expressways radially leading into the city through the Zagreb bypass. Major highways and expressways include A1/A6, leading to Gorski Kotar, the Littoral and Dalmatia; A3 leading west to Rakitje, Samobor, Žumberak and Slovenia and east to Rugvica, Ivanić-Grad, Slavonia and Serbia; A2 leading northwest to Zaprešić, Zabok, Krapina and Central Europe; A4 leading northeast to Varaždin, Čakovec, Hungary and on to Eastern Europe; A11 leading southeast to Velika Gorica, Sisak and Petrinja (still under construction) and D10 leading east to Vrbovec and Križevci.

=== Bridges ===
Due to years of disrepair, the Adriatic Bridge suffered damage in the 2020 Zagreb earthquake, and was repaired in 2024. Works are planned to start on the reconstruction of the Liberty Bridge, built in 1959, and the Youth Bridge, built in 1974. Zagreb features six road bridges across the Sava river, the newest being the Homeland Bridge. Zagreb road bridges are congested during the rush hour, since there were 3 additional bridges planned in the past 50 years which have not been built as of 2024. Zagreb mayor Tomislav Tomašević announced to the media that he plans to build the planned three bridges in the next several years. There are also plans to expand the Zagreb bypass to alleviate congestion, but traffic experts are skeptical that adding more lanes will solve the problem due to induced demand.

Name	Year finished	Type	Road that goes over	Other information
Road bridges
Podsused Bridge	1982	Two-lane road bridge with a commuter train line (not yet completed)	Samoborska Road	Connects Zagreb to its close suburbs by a road to Samobor, the fastest route to Bestovje, Sveta Nedelja, and Strmec.
Jankomir Bridge	1958, 2006 (upgrade)	Four-lane road bridge	Ljubljanska Avenue	Connects Ljubljanska Avenue to the Jankomir interchange and Zagreb bypass.
Adriatic Bridge	1981	Six-lane road bridge (also carries tram tracks)	Adriatic Avenue	The most famous bridge in Zagreb. The bridge spans from Savska Street in the north to the Remetinec Roundabout in the south.
Liberty Bridge	1959	Four-lane road bridge	Većeslav Holjevac Avenue	Relieved the congested Sava Bridge. 1,600 tons of steel were used to build it.
Youth Bridge	1974	Six-lane road bridge (also carries tram tracks)	Marin Držić Avenue	Connects districts Zapruđe and Trnje.
Homeland Bridge	2007	Four-lane road bridge (also carries two bicycle and two pedestrian lanes; has space reserved for tram tracks)	Radnička (Workers') Road	This bridge is the last bridge built on the Sava river to date; it links Peščenica via Radnička street to the Zagreb bypass at Kosnica. It is planned to continue towards Zagreb Airport at Pleso and Velika Gorica, and on to state road D31 going to the south.
Railway bridges
Hendrix Bridge	1939	Two-way railway bridge	–	The first bridge on that location was built in 1862 and was later replaced. It got its name after a graffiti saying "Hendrix", referring to Jimi Hendrix, kept reappearing on the bridge despite the authorities removing it.
Sava-Jakuševec Bridge	1968	Two-way railway bridge	–	Built by Đuro Đaković.
Pedestrian bridge
Sava Bridge	1938	Pedestrian bridge	Savska Road	The official name at the time of building was New Sava Bridge, but it is the oldest still standing bridge over Sava. It was pedestrianized after the Adriatic Bridge was opened.

=== Taxicabs ===
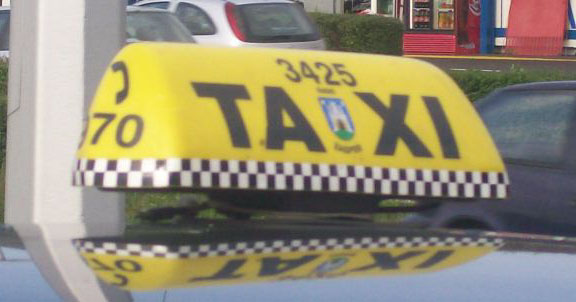
The light sign of a Zagreb taxicab

The first taxicab ever in Zagreb started operating on 11 June 1901. It was driven by Tadija Bartolović, a skilled fiaker driver. After a successful test drive where Bartolović drove mayor Adolf Mošinsky through Mesnička Street and Gornji Grad, the first taxicab stand in the city was opened on the Ban Jelačić Square.

The association of taxicab drivers Radio Taksi Zagreb, of over 1,150 taxicabs, was the sole provider of taxi services in the city before 2011, when the first of many competitive services started to run taxicabs in the city. The taxi market has been liberalized in early 2018, and numerous transport companies have been allowed to enter the market. Despite this liberalization, taxi prices were prevented from increasing too much via legislation that capped them on one tenth of the average monthly salary.

Bolt, Uber, Wizi, and Eko taxi operate taxi services in the city.

== Cycling ==
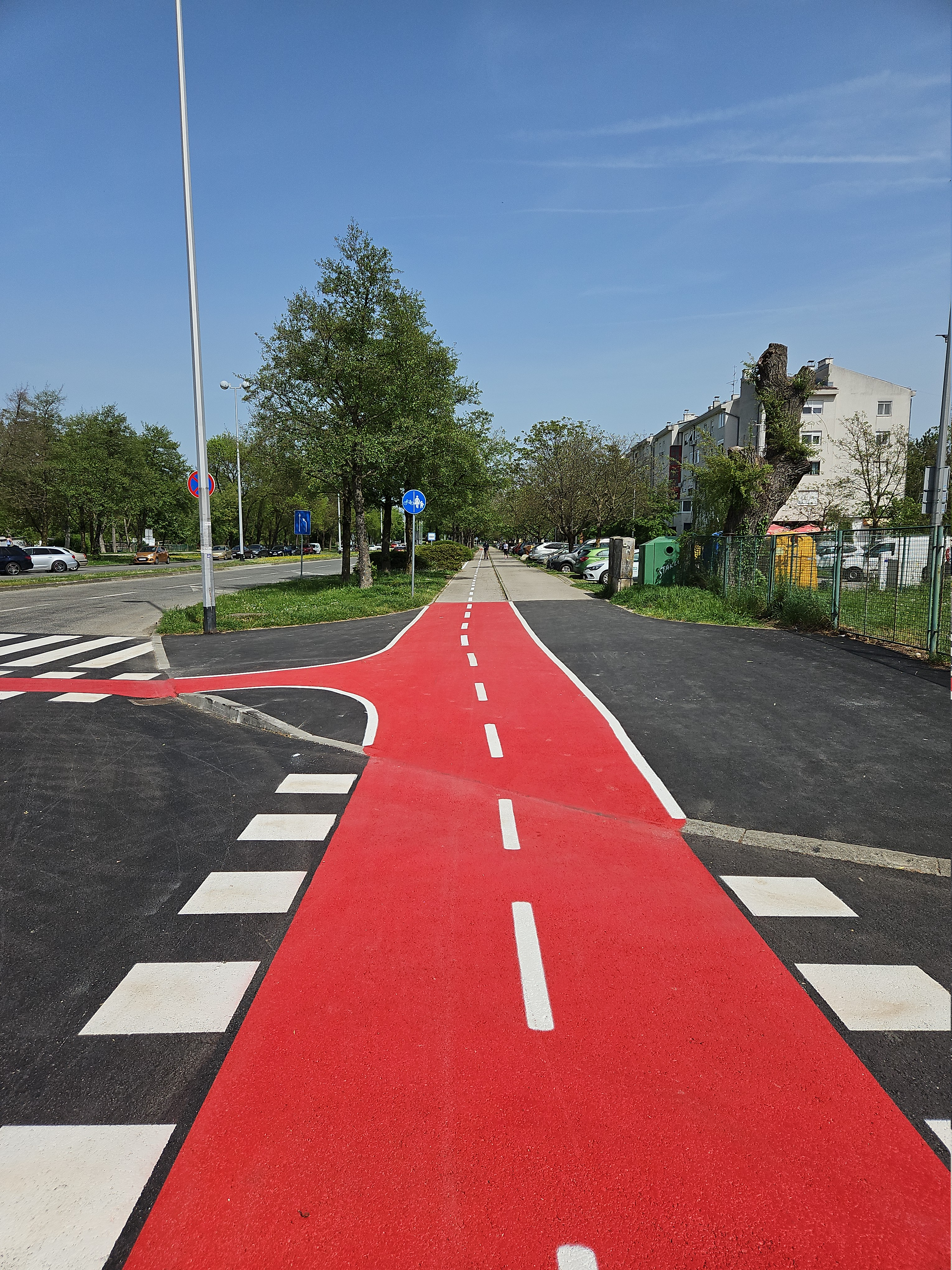
Bike lane in Jarun

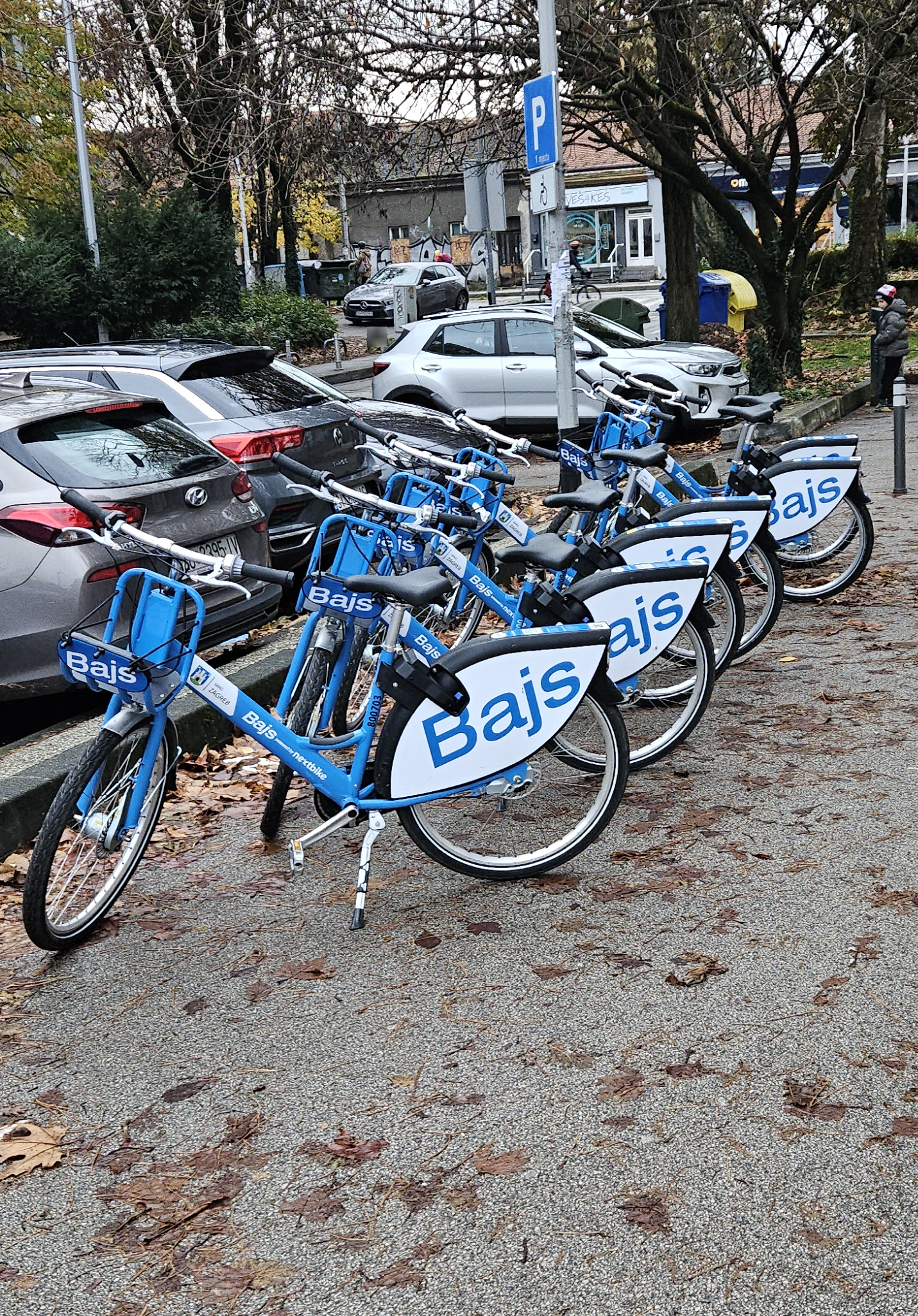
Bajs bike sharing system

Zagreb has 320 km (200 mi) of bike lanes, opposed to 2,627 km (1,632 mi) of roads. The bike network is mostly concentrated in the city centre and alongside major avenues, while individual neighbourhoods have very little to no infrastructure at all. It is also not interconnected – many lanes end abruptly, forcing the cyclists to either continue on the curb or on the road. Most bike lanes are just a painted curb, on which pedestrians often accidentally step causing clashes and crashes. Because for so long new lanes were only built on the curb, newer, more modern designs that put bike lanes on the road are met with backlash from drivers who were taught that the bikes belong on the curb with pedestrians. Zagreb has scored 90th place out of 100 on the Copenhagenize Index 2025, which ranks bike friendliness of cities. In 2022, Zagreb had 2,023 bike parking spaces on 322 different locations. While less common today, ladder racks can still be found instead of U-racks (the preferred variant). Bikes can only be secured to the ladder racks from the tire, which can be easily detached from the frame, increasing the chance of the bike being stolen. Zagreb is largely flat, except for the northern parts, situated on the Medvednica mountain, which in turn are also more sparsely populated. Zagreb has warm summers and cold winters. Despite the winter weather which can make cycling more difficult, the city has promoted winter commuting by bike, and fared well in a worldwide contest in 2016 called Winter Bike-to-Work Day.

The city has a bike-sharing system called Bajs (Croatian slang for bicycle) which began operation in 2025. Bajs was made in collaboration between the city and Nextbike’s Public bicycle system, who were the only ones to make an offer to build and manage the system. It is the successor of Nextbike’s own system, but with a bigger scope and a new app, for a price of €9.3 million before taxes. It currently consists of 2,000 bikes on 180 locations. In the first month, the system had accumulated more than 20,000 users.

== Public transport ==
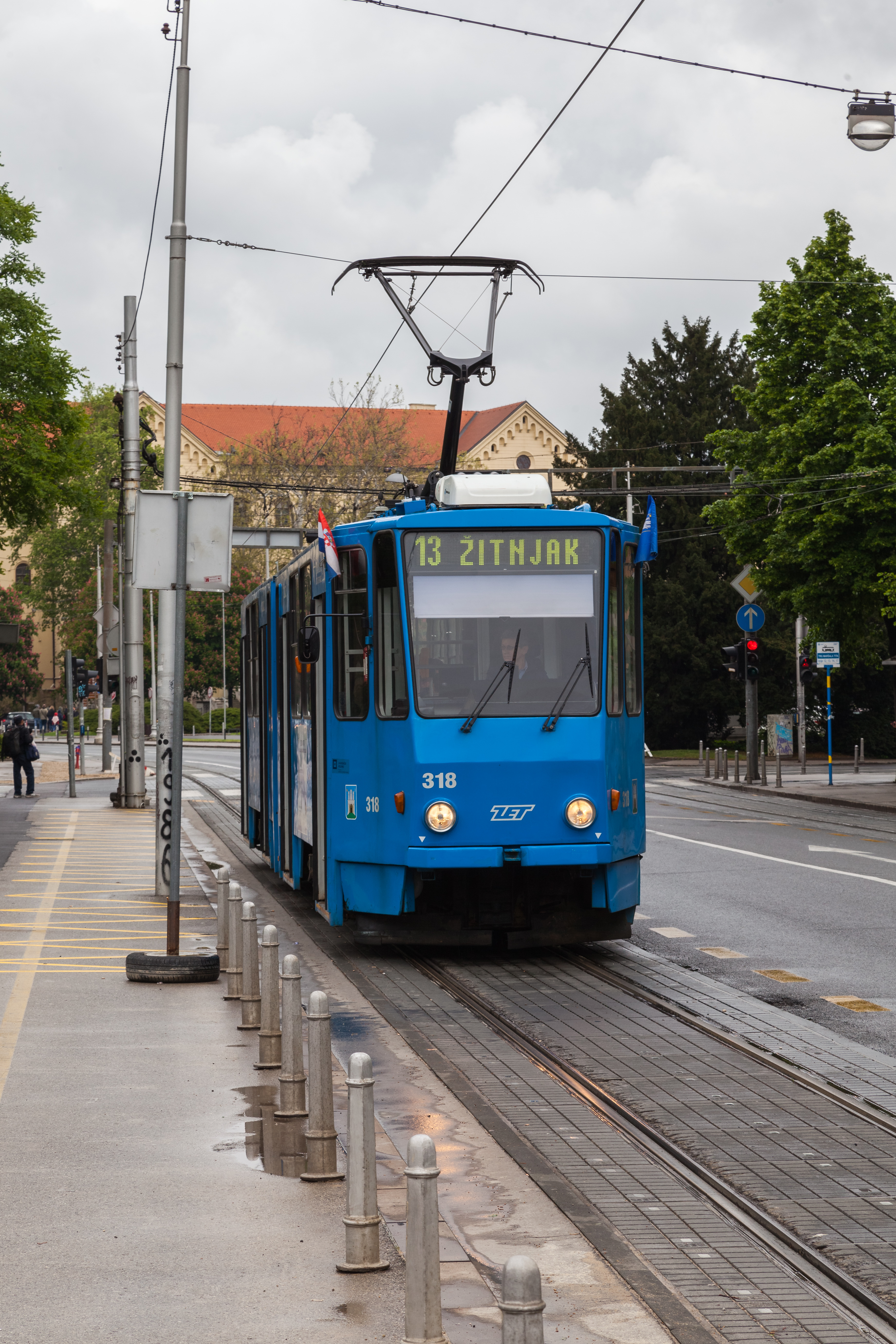
Tatra KT4 on Republic of Croatia Square

Mass transit in Zagreb is managed by the public company Zagreb Electric Tram. ZET's trams used to span the entire city, but due to only two expansions (the Dubec and Prečko routes) in the 21st century, tram infrastructure did not keep up with the city's growth. A bus network supplements the trams and covers large parts of the metropolitan area, as well as nearby towns. The Zagreb Cable Car connects the Gračani neighborhood and the tram line 15 terminal with the highest peak of the Medvednica mountain. Zagreb public transit is poorly developed compared to other EU cities, and citizens prefer to use cars instead of riding on the public transit. In 2023, public procurement procedure started for building additional tram lines in Zagreb, specifically connecting Eugen Kvaternik Square via Heinzelova Street with Žitnjak, and connecting Zapruđe with Dugave. Initially, there were plans to connect the future tram railway from Savišće to the Zagreb Airport via the Homeland Bridge, but the plans were altered in favor of using the existing railway infrastructure to connect the airport with the Zagreb Main Railway Station.

=== Tram ===
The tram network

The first tram line was opened on September 5, 1891, setting off a vital part of the Zagreb mass transit system. Zagreb today features an extensive tram network with 15 day and 4 night lines running over 116.3 km (72.3 mi) of tracks through 256 stations and transporting little more than 333,000 passengers per day. The network covers much of the inner city, but some lines extend to the suburbs, such as line 15 (operating in Podsljeme) or lines 7 and 11 (operating in Dubec). Although the trams are capable of achieving speeds of 70 km/h (43 mph), the fact that the network operates mostly at the curb limits their speed to the speed of surrounding vehicles, causing the trams to travel less than 13 km/h (8.1 mph) on average, with slowdowns during the rush hours. In the city centre where the streets are more narrow, trams either share their lane with car traffic resulting in slower service, or have a dedicated lane separated from car traffic by a yellow line, which is often ignored by drivers. Outside the city centre, trams primarily run on reserved tracks in the middle of the street (or avenue).

The rolling stock is made up by various trams, including around 50 ČKD-Tatra T4 remaining from 1970's (a few more may be stored and out of service for longer periods), 51 Tatra KT4, 16 TMK 2100 and 142 new, 100% low-floor TMK 2200 cars, of those 140 are 32 m standard version and only 2 shorter 21 m, with a further purchase planned. TMK 2200 is produced by the Crotram consortium, composed of Končar and TŽV Gredelj, both from Zagreb.

==== Daytime lines ====
Line	From	Via	To	Depot	Notes
1	West railway station (Zapadni kolodvor)	Ban Jelačić Square	Borongaj	Trešnjevka	Does not operate on weekends and public holidays
2	Črnomerec	Jukić Street, Central Railway Station, Zagreb Bus Terminal	Savišće	Trešnjevka	
3	Ljubljanica	City of Vukovar Street	Savišće	Trešnjevka	Does not operate on weekends and public holidays
4	Sava bridge	Central railway station, Maksimir Park	Dubec	Dubrava	
5	Prečko	City of Vukovar Street, Bus Terminal	Maksimir Park	Trešnjevka	
6	Črnomerec	Ban Jelačić Square, Central Railway Station, Bus terminal	Sopot	Dubrava	
7	Sava Bridge	Zagreb Fair, Bus terminal	Dubrava	Dubrava	
8	Zapruđe	Bus terminal	Mihaljevac	Dubrava	Does not operate on weekends and public holidays
9	Ljubljanica	Central Railway Station	Borongaj	Trešnjevka	
11	Črnomerec	Ban Jelačić Square, Maksimir Park	Dubec	Trešnjevka / Dubrava	
12	Ljubljanica	Ban Jelačić Square	Dubrava	Trešnjevka	
13	Žitnjak	City of Vukovar Street, Ban Jelačić Square, Central Railway Station	Eugen Kvaternik Square	Dubrava	
14	Mihaljevac	Ban Jelačić Square, Savska Road, Zagreb Fair	Zapruđe	Dubrava	
15	Mihaljevac	Gračani	Gračansko Dolje	Dubrava	
17	Prečko	Savska Road (Savska cesta), Ban Jelačić Square	Borongaj	Trešnjevka	

==== Nighttime lines ====
Line	From	Via	To	Depot	Notes
31	Črnomerec	Ban Jelačić Square, Central Railway Station, Zagreb Bus Terminal, Zagreb Fair	Sava Bridge	Dubrava	
32	Prečko	Savska Road, Ban Jelačić Square	Borongaj	Trešnjevka	Route is equivalent to daytime line 17
33	Gračansko Dolje	Central Railway Station, Valentin Vodnik Street, City of Vukovar Street	Savišće	Dubrava	
34	Ljubljanica	Ban Jelačić square, Central railway station, Maksimir Road (Maksimirska cesta)	Dubec	Trešnjevka	

=== Bus ===
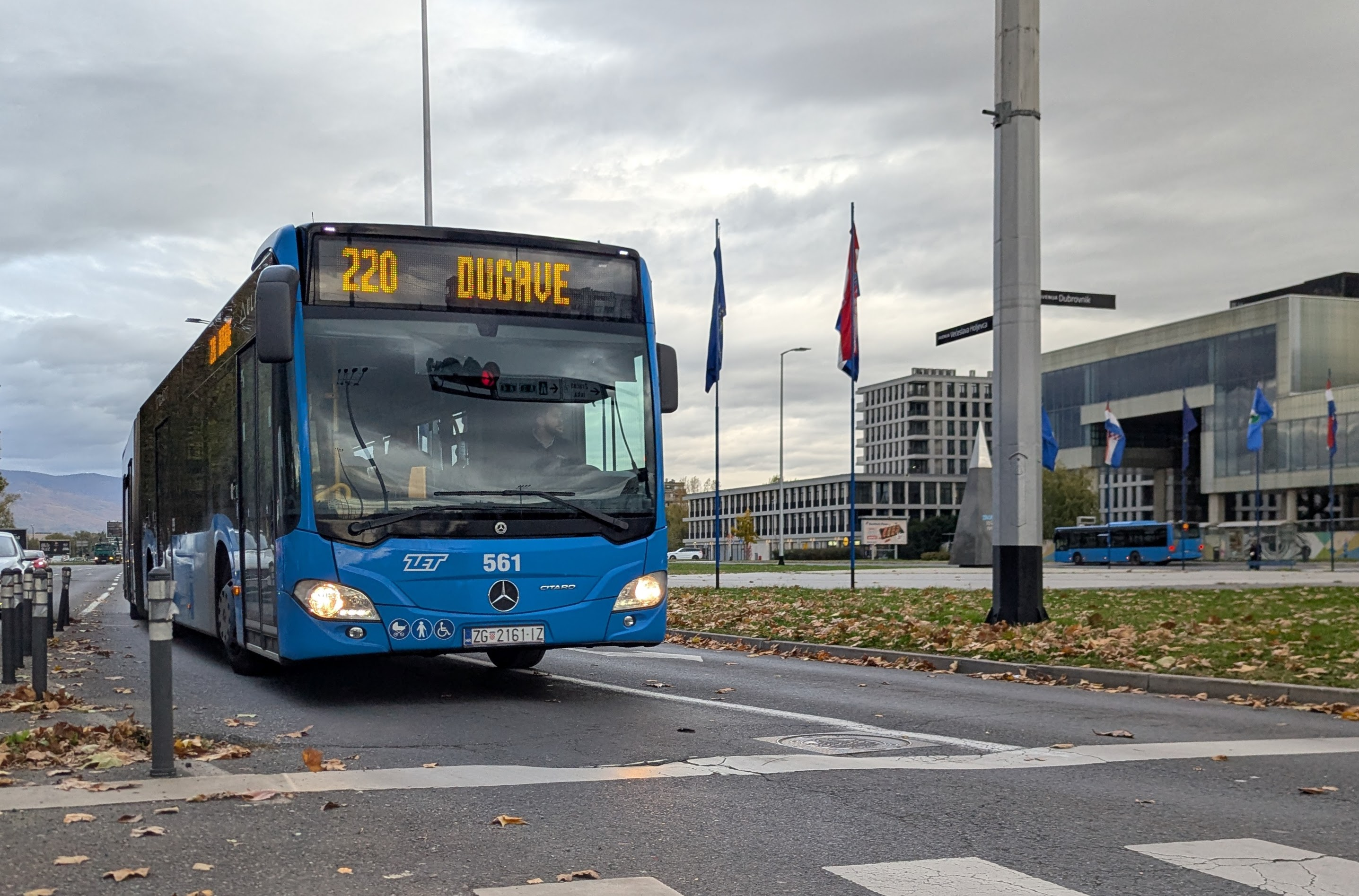
Mercedes-Benz bus next to the Museum of Contemporary Art

The 147 bus lines operated by ZET mainly serve neighbourhoods outside the city centre, suburbs and satellite towns, with the daily ridership being more than 153,000 on average. The length of all lines adds up to 1,524 km (947 mi), with the vast majority of lines not having their own dedicated bus lanes. The 474-strong fleet consists of low-floor MAN, Mercedes-Benz and Iveco busses. Bus transport was first introduced to the city in 1927 under the enterprise Bus Transport. In 1930, the ownership was transferred to V. & M. Barešić & Company and their affiliate company Autobrzovoz. Shortly after, in 1931, the City Savings Bank bought the system and commissioned the enterprise City Bus Transport to manage the lines, which later merged with ZET.

Up until 2007, all busses were powered by non-renewable sources (mostly diesel), which changed with the purchase of 12 biodiesel models as part of the green transition. The first fully electric bus was put in service in 2025.

=== Cable car ===
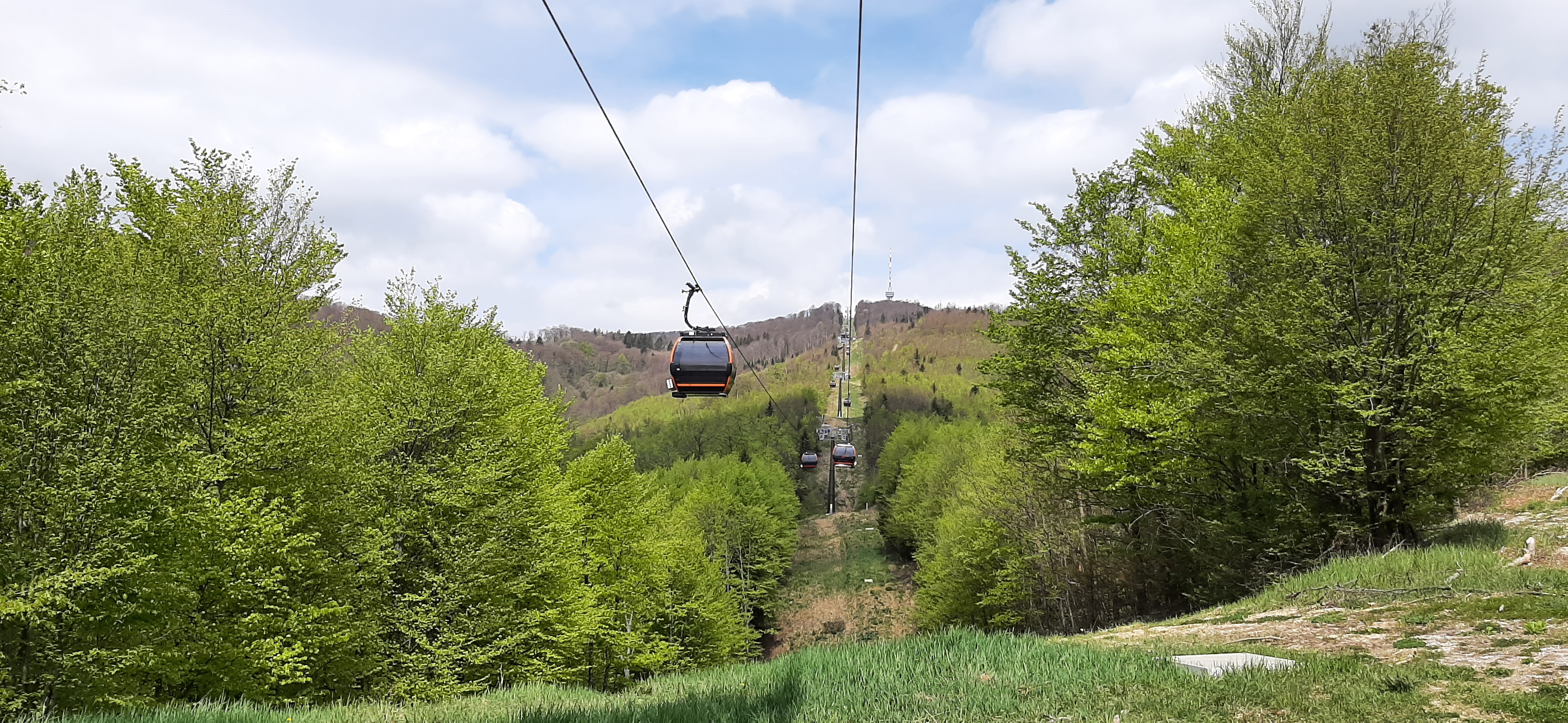
Gondola lift

The Zagreb Cable Car is a gondola lift that connects the Podsljeme district and the tram line 15 terminal with the highest peak of the Medvednica mountain. The old lift was in operation from 1963 to 2007, when it broke down and the repairs were found to be too costly. A new, modern gondola lift replaced it in 2022 for a cost of €71.27 million, and which can carry 1,500 people per hour at an average speed of 20 km/h (12 mph). It is 5,017 m (16,460 ft) long; the base station is located at an altitude of 267 m (876 ft) above sea level, while the top station is at an altitude of 1,030 m (3,380 ft) – a 763 m (2,503 ft) difference.

=== Funicular ===
The Zagreb Funicular is a funicular that runs service every 10 minutes from 6:30 a.m. to 10 p.m., seven days a week, and connects Ilica and the Lower Town with the Upper Town. The funicular track is 66 metres (217 ft) long and the trip lasts 64 seconds, making it one of the shortest funiculars in the world. It is legally protected as a cultural monument. It was opened in 1890 with a steam engine, which was upgraded to an electric one in 1934.

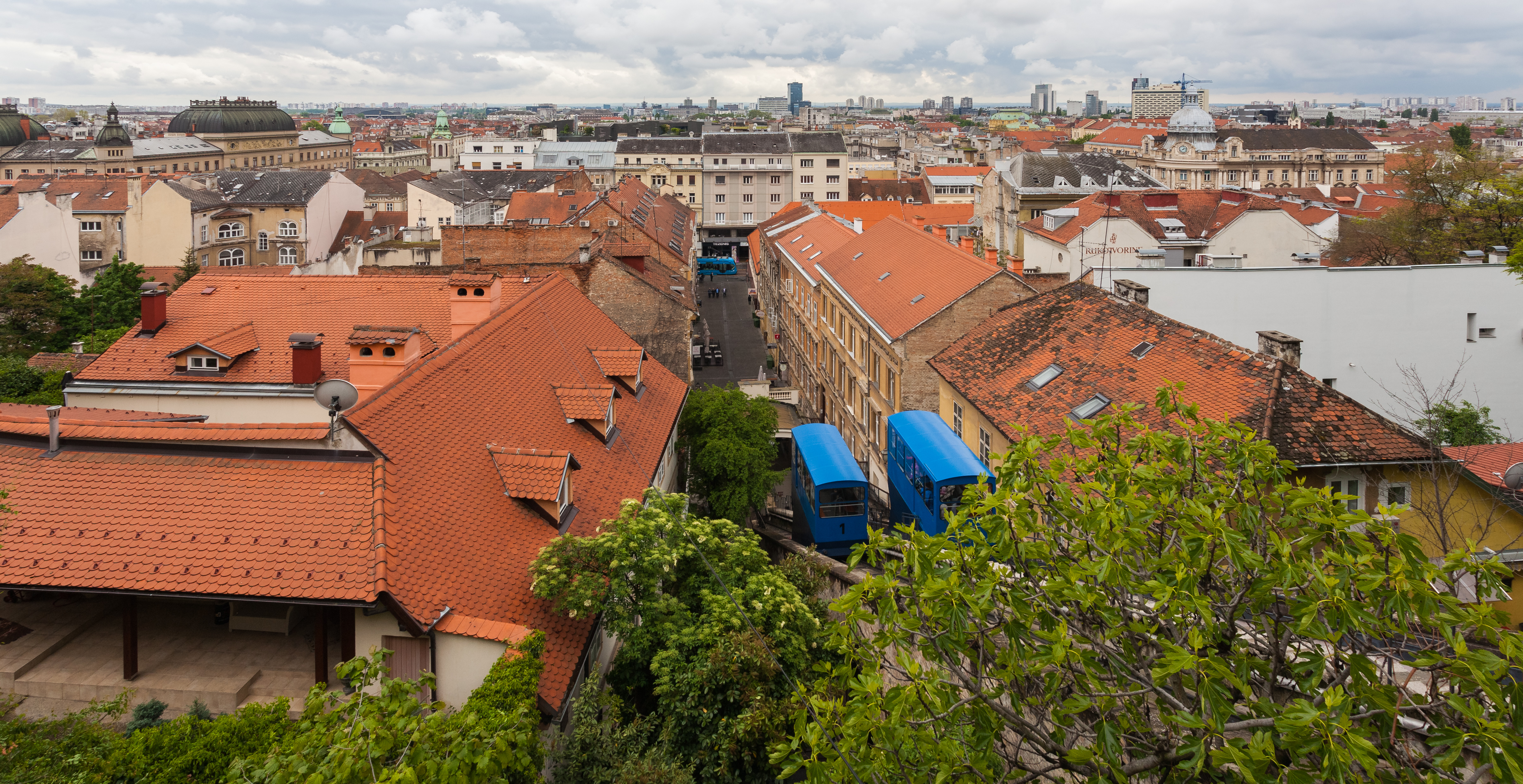
Panoramic view from Zagreb's Upper town with Zagreb funicular and Lower town

=== Metro and rapid transit ===
Zagreb has no metro nor rail rapid transit (RRT). An overground RRT or a metro system have been proposed numerous times, which would complement the tram, bus, and commuter rail networks, but never built. The need comes from the fact that Zagreb has regular traffic jams and the average speed of trams is 13 km/h (8.1 mph). The first plans to build a metro were made in 1971, with the building of a metro system first appearing in the General Transport Plan in 1979. In 1999, MVA consultancy was commissioned for the creation of a traffic study; it evaluated a set of two metro lines (Gajnice–Sesvete and Ban Jelačić Square–Velika Gorica), but concluded that the costs were unjustified compared to building a light rail system, extending tram lines and a park and ride system. Despite that, mayor Milan Bandić made multiple promises to build a metro, all to no avail.

A definitive concept for RRT or a metro has never been decided upon, mostly due to funding issues caused by budgetary constraints. Zagreb has favorable conditions for building a metro, and a similar land composition to Vienna, which has a vast underground system. While the city does have underground waters, it doesn’t impose an issue for metro construction because of modern construction methods. Concerns that the city does not have the adequate population, therefore a metro system would be too costly and overly excessive, are lessened by the population of around 1.2 million people in its commuter belt. Strict population requirements are considered obsolete, as many smaller cities like Lausanne in Switzerland have one. The high cost could be offset by EU funds.

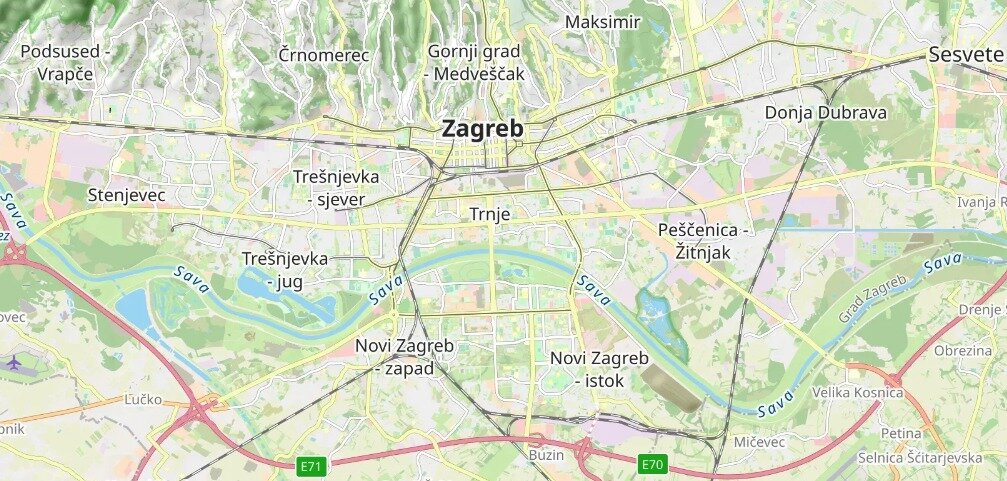
This map of the city shows railway tracks (thick black-white lines), tram tracks (thin black lines), major arterial roads (yellow lines) and the motorway bypass (red lines)

Creating new overground rapid rail transit lines would be a less costly solution with similar benefits to a metro, and would share existing rail tracks through the city with through traffic and suburban lines. Today, rail freight traffic needs to pass through the city, slowing down service. To combat this, a new plan was proposed in 2025 to build a freight bypass around Zagreb to free up space for more passenger transport inside the city. The current railway infrastructure is also far away from populous neighbourhoods like Jarun, Prečko, and Špansko, something the metro would fix.

Another hurdle with this approach is the fact that the rail tracks in the city are owned by HŽ Infrastruktura, the state-owned infrastructure manager, instead of ZET, the city transit authority. In 2014, the City of Zagreb, together with Zagreb County and Krapina-Zagorje County, created IPZP (short for Integrated Transport in the Zagreb Area), a public-owned company to coordinate all projects for integrated transport in the region. But because the company lacks real authority, all attempts to create a rapid rail system still need to be coordinated between the city and HŽ Infrastruktura. Despite bureaucratic hurdles, as of 2025 there are plans to better use the already existing railway and build three new stations, supported by mayor Tomislav Tomašević, and the topic of better integrating rail transport into the city's public transport system has been a topic of discussion in the City Assembly.

== Commuter rail ==
Commuter rail

Overview
- Locale: Zagreb metropolitan area
- Transit type: Commuter rail Rapid transit
- Number of lines: 1
- Number of stations: 19

Operation
- Began operation: 1992
- Operator: Croatian Railways

Technical
- System length: 47 km (29 mi)
- Track gauge: 1435 mm
- Electrification: 25 kV, 50 Hz AC overhead lines

Zagreb Commuter Rail is the suburban/commuter railway network that provides mass-transit service in the city of Zagreb, Croatia and its suburbs. This suburban rail system, introduced in 1992 on the route Savski Marof – Zagreb Main Station – Dugo Selo, is operated by Croatian Railways and mainly covers the eastern and western parts of Zagreb, using the M102 corridor between Dugo Selo and Zagreb Main Station and M101 corridor between Zagreb Main Station and Savski Marof.

With 21 trains, the Zagreb suburban railway mainly covers the eastern and western parts of Zagreb. It mostly operates on the same standard-gauge lines used for Croatian Railways' long-distance trains. The trains normally operate on a 15-minute frequency, but reach only a portion of the city's suburbs. Most commuters use the M102 corridor between Dugo Selo and Zagreb Main Station and M101 corridor between Zagreb Main Station and Savski Marof/Harmica. Traffic experts criticise the location of railway stations on the east-west line, as well as the fact that the bus lines are running parallel to the east-west rail line, further exacerbating road congestion. There is a north-south corridor connecting the neighborhoods of Remetinec (M202) and Sveta Klara (M502), but they are not commonly used due to the time gap between trains arriving being on average longer than an hour and the lack of parking spaces near the aforementioned stations, even though they provide the fastest access from Novi Zagreb to the city centre, with the travel time of 8–9 minutes.

=== Rolling stock ===
Since the system started operating, the lines have been serviced by HŽ series 6111 EMU's built by Ganz. In 2011, a prototype of a new series of EMU trains for suburban traffic of the City of Zagreb was handed over to the Croatian Railways for use by the KONČAR Group (series 6112-1 and 6112–2; suburban version). Between 2015 and 2023, an additional 27 sets of the 6112 series were delivered, gradually replacing all 6111 sets on the suburban lines.

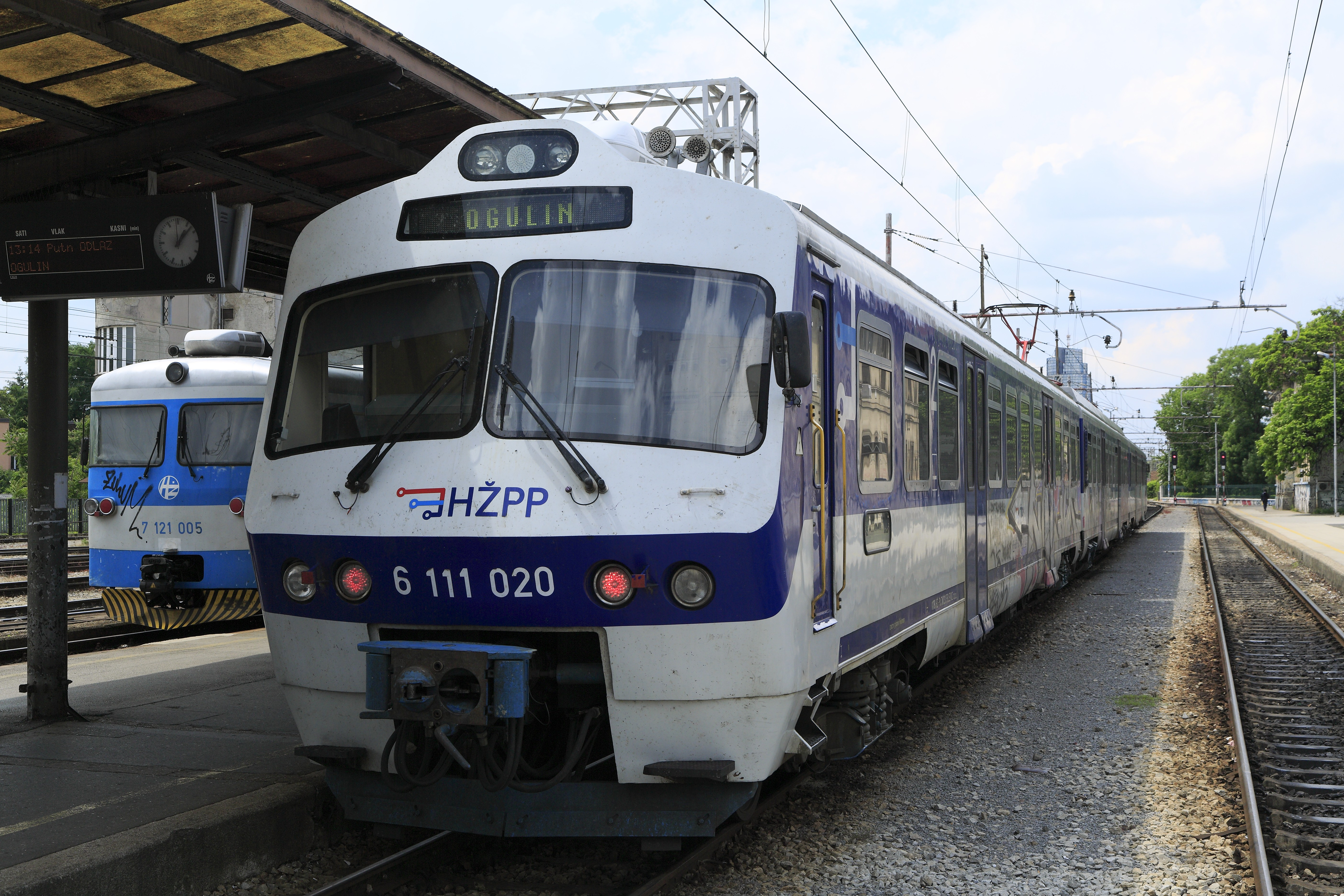
HŽ series 6111 train at Zagreb Main Station

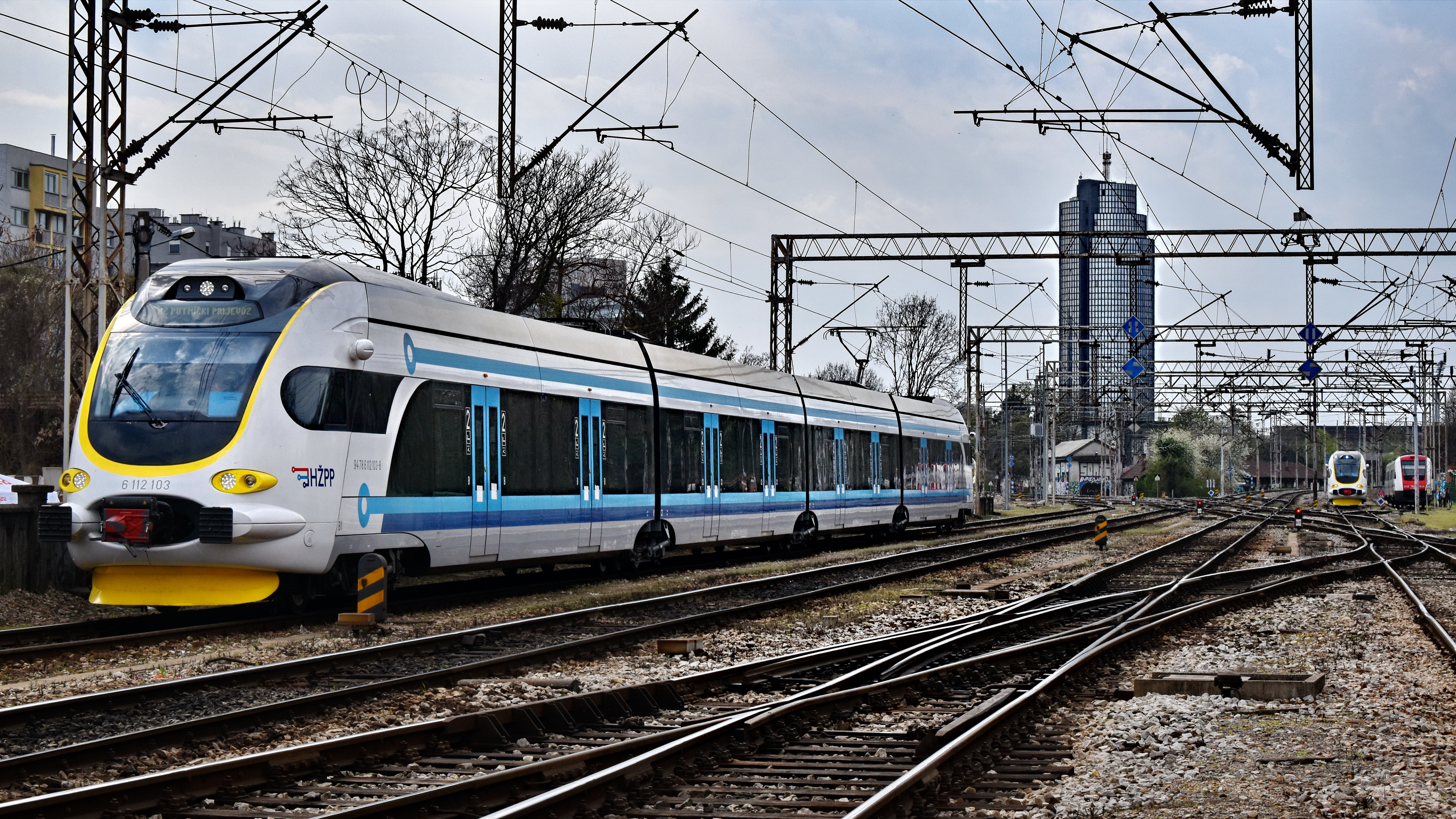
HŽ series 6112 train built by Končar

== Airports ==
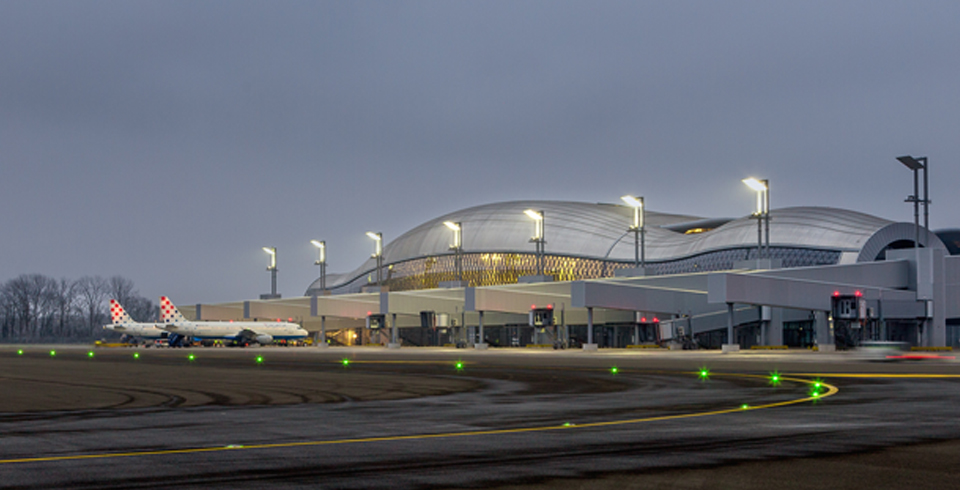
New passenger terminal opened in 2017

Zagreb Franjo Tuđman Airport (IATA: ZAG, ICAO: LDZA) is the main Croatian international airport, a 17 km (11 mi) drive southeast of Zagreb in the city of Velika Gorica. The airport is also the main Croatian airbase featuring a fighter squadron, helicopters, as well as military and freight transport aircraft. The new passenger terminal was opened in late March 2017 at a cost of €243 million that can accommodate up to 5.5 million passengers a year. It had 3.45 million passengers in 2019, and in 2025 it hit record high of 4.72 million, making it the busiest airport in Croatia and one of the busiest airports in Europe. Zagreb Airport is the only airport in Croatia that has direct flights with Canada, and one of two (with Dubrovnik Airport) to have direct flights with North America. The airport is served by a bus line from Eugen Kvaternik Square.

Zagreb also has a second, smaller airport, Lučko Airfield (ICAO: LDZL). It is home to sports airplanes, airplanes for training purposes of the Faculty of Transport and Traffic Sciences, a Croatian special police unit, as well as being a military helicopter airbase. Lučko used to be the main airport of Zagreb from its opening in 1947 until 1959. A third, small grass airfield, Buševec, is located just outside Velika Gorica. It is primarily used for sports purposes.

The first airfield in the city was built in 1909 in Črnomerec, recording its first takeoff a year later when Slavoljub Penkala took a test flight with a biplane. A new airport was built in 1926 in Borongaj, and although it was replaced by the Lučko Airfield in 1947 as the city’s main airport, it remained in use until 1962. It was used as an air base by the Luftwaffe during WW2, and had suffered damage from bombardment by the allies. Zagreb Airport was established at its present location in 1962; it has since undergone several phases of expansion.

== Water transport ==
Water transport in Zagreb relates to the transport on the Sava River which flows through the city splitting its north and south, called Novi Zagreb (meaning "new Zagreb"). The city’s water transport has been inactive since the second half of the 20th century, with the nearest port being in Sisak. Sava had been used for the transportation of goods and peoples since Roman times, being first mentioned in Roman documents when its course was altered to connect with a quarry to transport stone for infrastructure projects. In the 14th century, the city became a trading hub for wheat and specifically salt, which was carried by vehicles from the Adriatic Sea and transferred on to vessels in Karlovac to continue upstream to Slovenia, passing through Zagreb. In the 16th century, the river was used to quickly transport infantry to help aid in the defense of the city against a siege by the Ottomans.

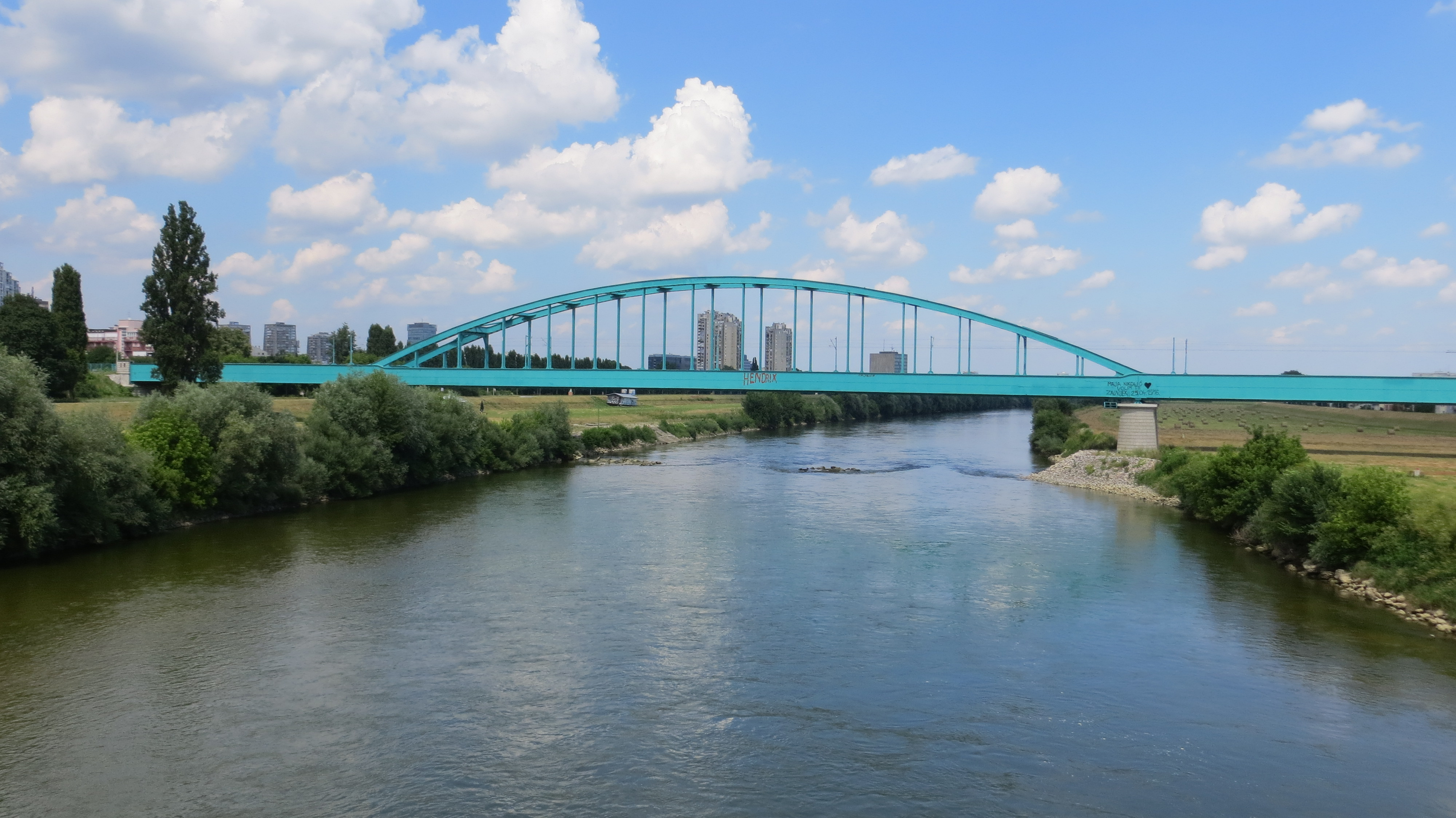
Embankments of the Sava River

Water transport in the city continued until the second half of the 20th century, when it stopped following unsuccessful plans to build a port and a fall in demand. With new bridges being built as well, rafts were no longer necessary to cross the river. Following the city’s last catastrophic flood in 1964, when an overflow affected 60 square kilometres (23 sq mi) of inner-city territory, city authorities had built a system of levees to protect itself from the river, together with the Sava-Odra discharge canal, completed in 1971. Since then the city's waterside has been strictly isolated, spanned only by seven bridges between north and south of the city.
