= Zagreb Funicular =

Cable railway in Zagreb, Croatia

Coordinates: 45°48′51″N 15°58′24″E

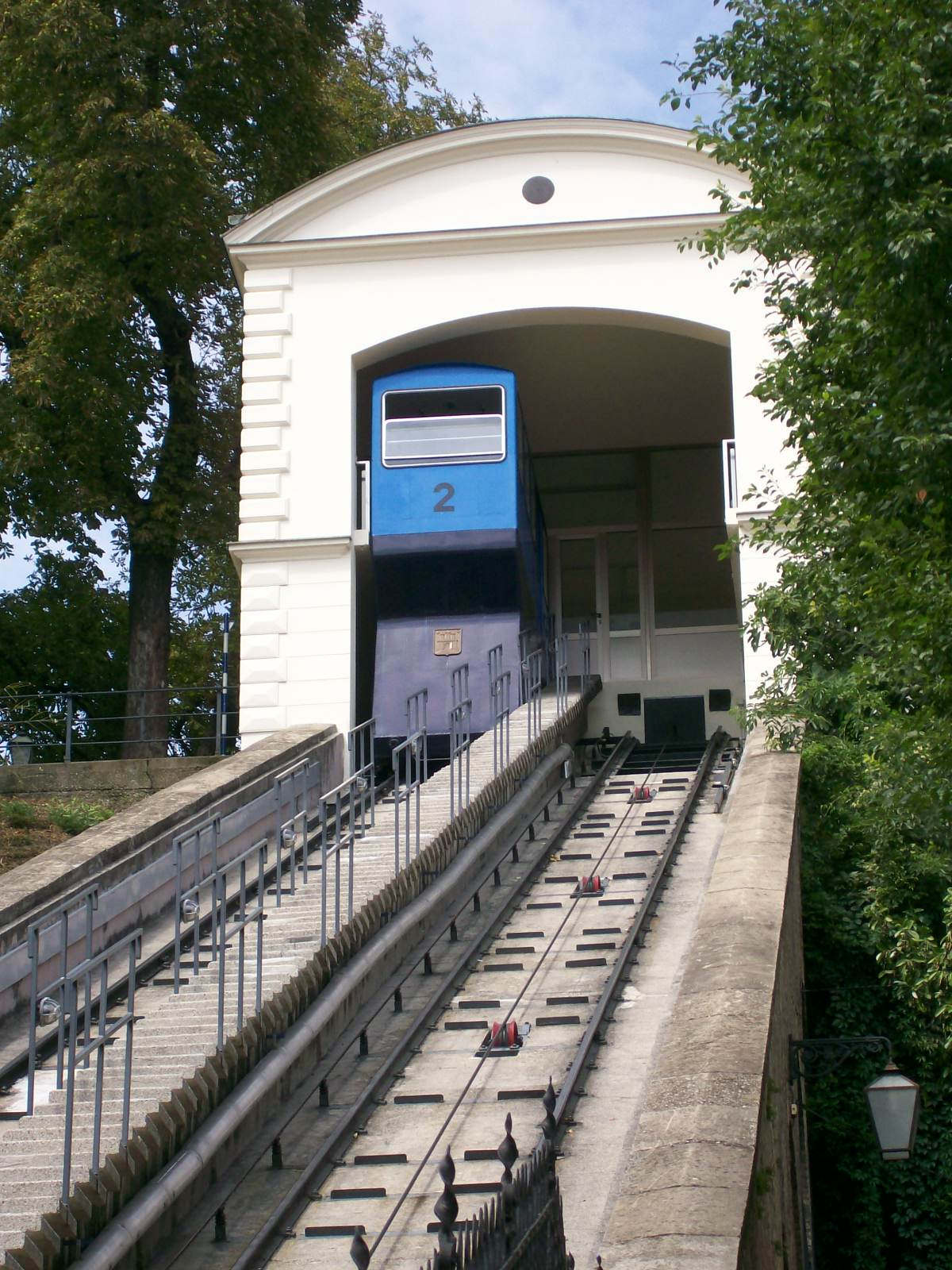
- Funicular cabin in signature blue colour

Overview
- Status: In use
- Locale: Ulica Josipa Eugena Tomića 7A Zagreb, Croatia
- Stations: 2

Service
- Type: Funicular
- Operator: Zagreb Electric Tram

History
- Opened: 1890

Technical
- Track length: 66 m (217 ft)
- Number of tracks: Double track
- Track gauge: 1,200 mm (3 ft 11 1/4 in)
- Operating speed: 1.5 m/s (4.9 ft/s)
- Highest elevation: 156.5 m (513 ft)
- Maximum incline: 52%

The Zagreb Funicular (Croatian: Zagrebačka uspinjača) is a funicular in Zagreb, Croatia, operated by the Zagreb Electric Tram, situated in Tomić Street, connecting Ilica (Donji Grad) with Strossmayerovo šetalište (Strossmayer promenade) to the north (Gornji Grad). Its 66-metre (217 ft) track makes it one of the shortest public-transport funiculars in the world.

== History ==
In 1888, D.W. Klein won a concession to build a funicular in Zagreb. The funicular was built and put into operation in 1890. The funicular was propelled by a steam engine. Initially, the steam pressure was so low, and repairs were so frequent, that it remained out of operation nearly half of the time. In 1934 its steam propulsion was replaced by an electric motor.

In 1969 operation of the funicular was suspended due to security reasons: its systems were worn out. Repairs lasted four and half years, and it was put back in operation on July 26, 1974.

Having in mind that it kept its original shape, constructional and most of the technical properties, it was given legal protection as a monument of culture.

On 20 January 2025 the funicular was closed down for operation until March 2026 for complete overhaul that includes track replacement with anti-vibration padding, installation of a new three-phase electric motor, hauling rope replacement, new air-conditioned cabins, disabled access to both stations and cabins as well as HVAC system improvements on both stations.

== Technical characteristics ==
The funicular runs at a speed of 1.5 m/s (4.9 ft/s), requiring 64 seconds to cross the distance. The funicular runs on a 66 m (217 ft) long and 1,200 mm (3 ft 11 1/4 in) wide gauge track, at an inclination of 52%. This makes it one of the shortest, but also one of the steepest funiculars in the world. The electrical engine is in the northern (upper) station. It has a power output of 28.5 kW (38.2 hp), and operates on 400 V direct current, at 720 revolutions per minute.

The bottom and top stations are at an elevation of 126 m (413 ft) and 156.5 m (513 ft) respectively, making for a height difference of 30.5 m (100 ft). The funicular has two cars for 28 passengers each (16 seated and 12 standing places). The cars are 5,640 mm (18.50 ft) long, and weigh 5.05 tonnes (4.97 long tons; 5.57 short tons) when empty. Each car can carry 2,240 kg (4,940 lb). The rides are scheduled every 10 minutes from 6:30 a.m. to 10 p.m., seven days a week.

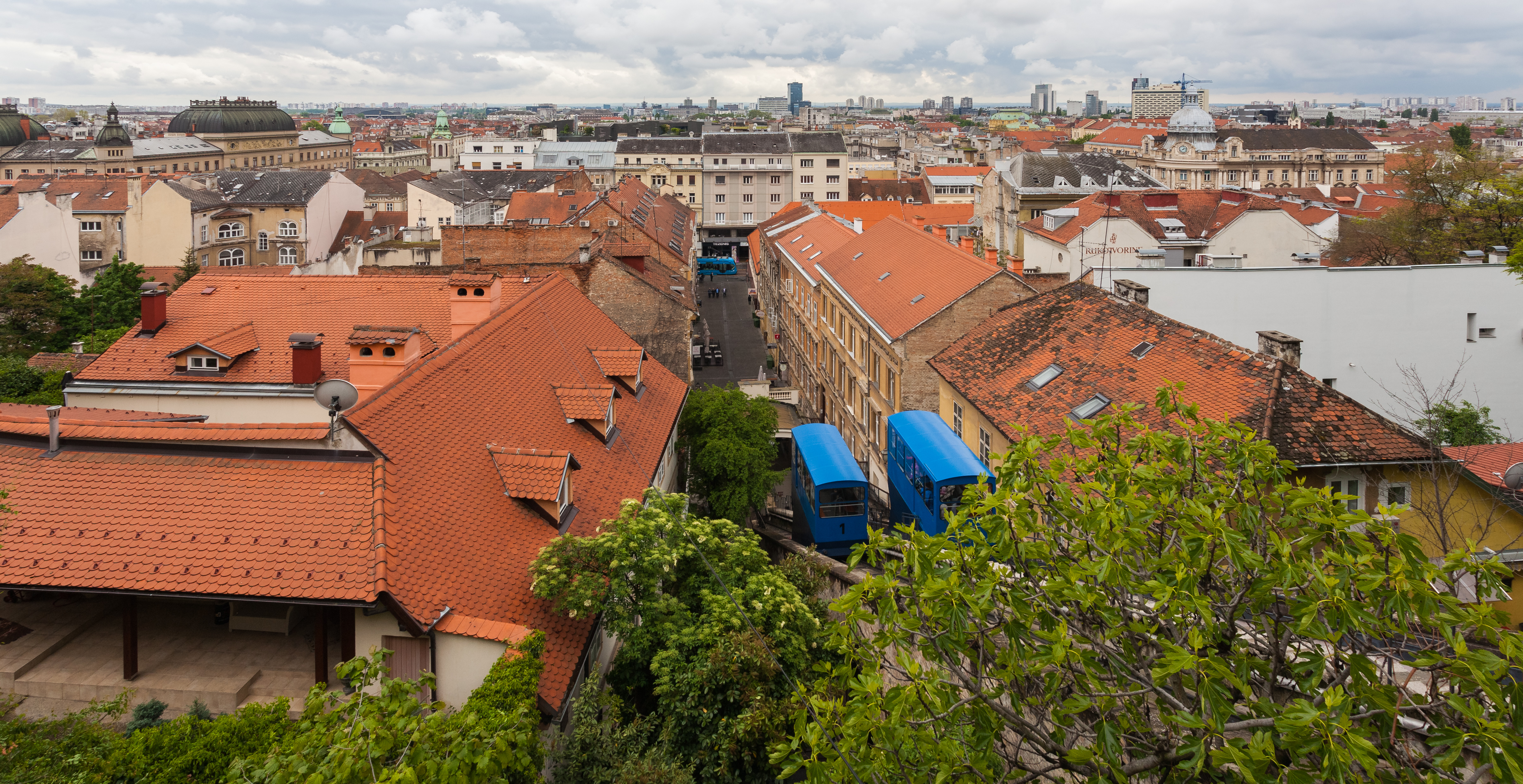
The view of the funicular and Ilica Street from Upper Town.

== See also ==
- List of funicular railways
- Transport in Zagreb
- Zagreb Electric Tram
