= Milan Amruš =

Croatian physician, lawyer and politician (1848–1919)

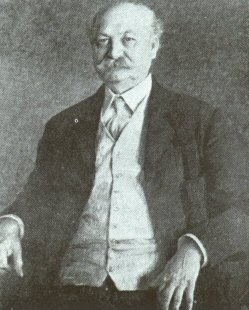

Mayor of Zagreb
- In office 29 January 1890 – 20 June 1892
- Preceded by: Ignjat Sieber
- Succeeded by: Adolf Mošinsky
- In office 15 December 1904 – 5 April 1910
- Preceded by: Adolf Mošinsky
- Succeeded by: Janko Holjac

Personal details
- Born: Milan Emil Amruš; 1 October 1848 Brod na Savi, Kingdom of Slavonia, Austrian Empire
- Died: 26 May 1919 (aged 70) Zagreb, Kingdom of Serbs, Croats and Slovenes
- Party: Independent People's Party
- Education: Josephinum Vienna; University of Zagreb
- Occupation: Surgeon

Milan Emil Amruš (1 October 1848 – 26 May 1919) was a Croatian physician, lawyer and politician, a two-term mayor of Zagreb.

Amruš was born in Brod na Savi, where he completed grammar school. He studied at the gymnasiums in Vinkovci and Zagreb, and then enrolled at the Josephinum, the academy for military doctors in Vienna. Since 1872 he worked in military hospitals in Vienna and Zagreb. After the Austro-Hungarian annexation of Bosnia, he moved to Sarajevo. He returned to Zagreb in 1882, when he also enrolled at the Faculty of Law at the University of Zagreb.

While in Zagreb, he joined the Independent People's Party and in 1889 he became a member of the Croatian Parliament where he would serve until 1903. He received a law doctorate in 1890. The same year he was named the mayor of Zagreb. In his capacity as mayor, he brought Nikola Tesla back from the United States in an effort to get the city electric lighting, but was unsuccessful. The Zagreb Main Station was built during this time. His first mayoral term ended in 1892.

In 1904, he was elected mayor again. His second term was much longer and much more fruitful than the first one. During it, the electrification of Zagreb was completed on 17 October 1907. The city also got a new maternity hospital, and the first public restrooms. The gasworks was moved out of the city center, and during this time the company Zagrebački zbor was started, the precursor to the Zagreb Fair.

In 1911, ban Nikola Tomašić named him his deputy for matters of religion and education. In that role, Amruš started an effort to found technical faculties at the Universities, but could not achieve that goal until the end of World War I in 1918.

Amruš had no children and was in fact known as a hardfisted person, but in his will he left everything, including two major mansions at Zrinjevac and a rural estate in Zdenčina near Klinča Sela, to the city. He died in Zagreb at the age of 70. He was named an honorary citizen of Zagreb in 1919. His former estate was later turned into an orphanage, which was then named after him.

Political offices
Preceded by Ignjat Sieber	Mayor of Zagreb; 1890–1892	Succeeded by Adolf Mošinsky
Preceded by Adolf Mošinsky	Mayor of Zagreb; 1904–1910	Succeeded by Janko Holjac
