= HŽ series 6111 =

Class of Yugoslavian electric multiple units

HŽ 6111 (formerly JŽ 411)
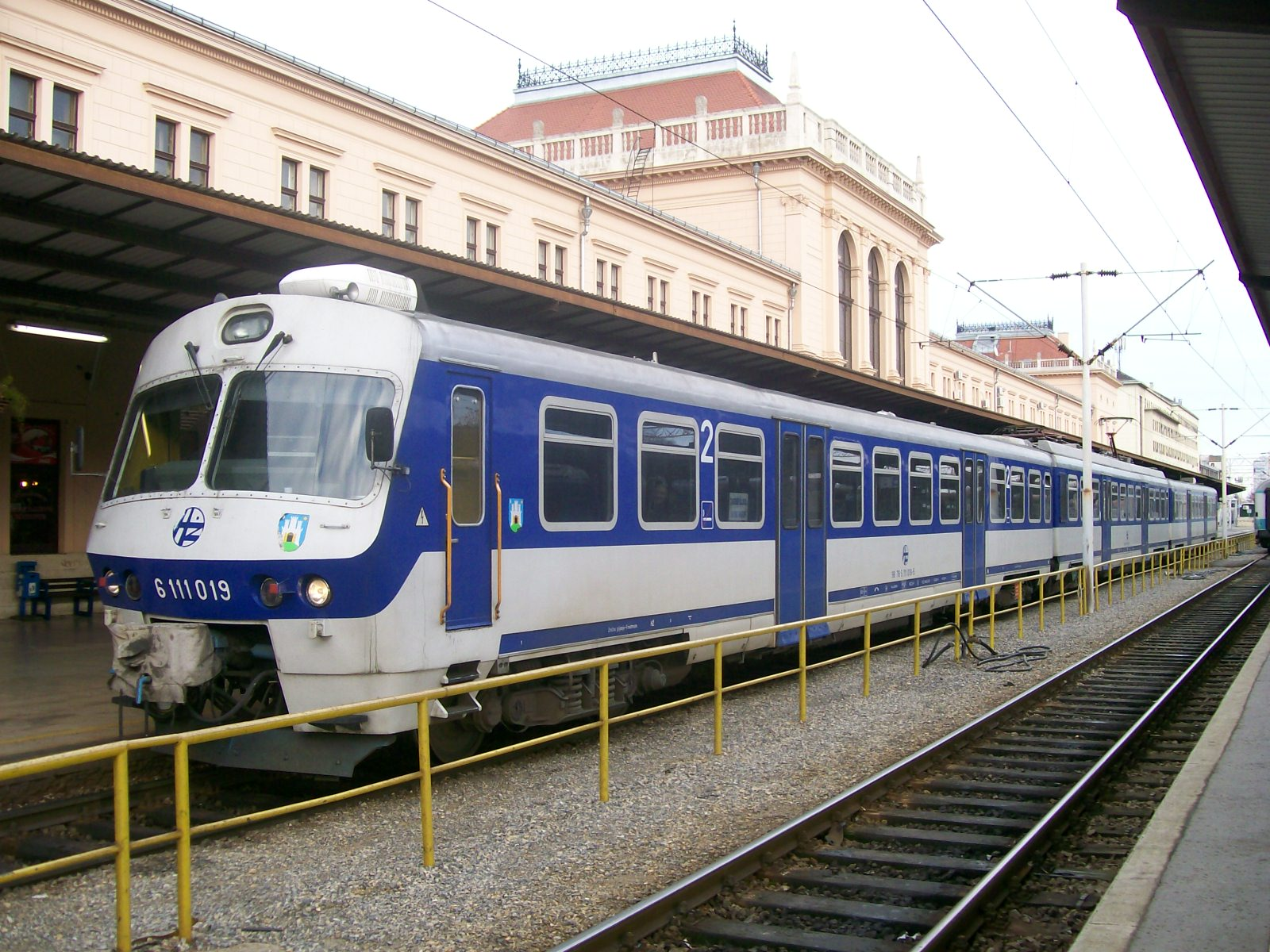
- Croatian electric motor unit

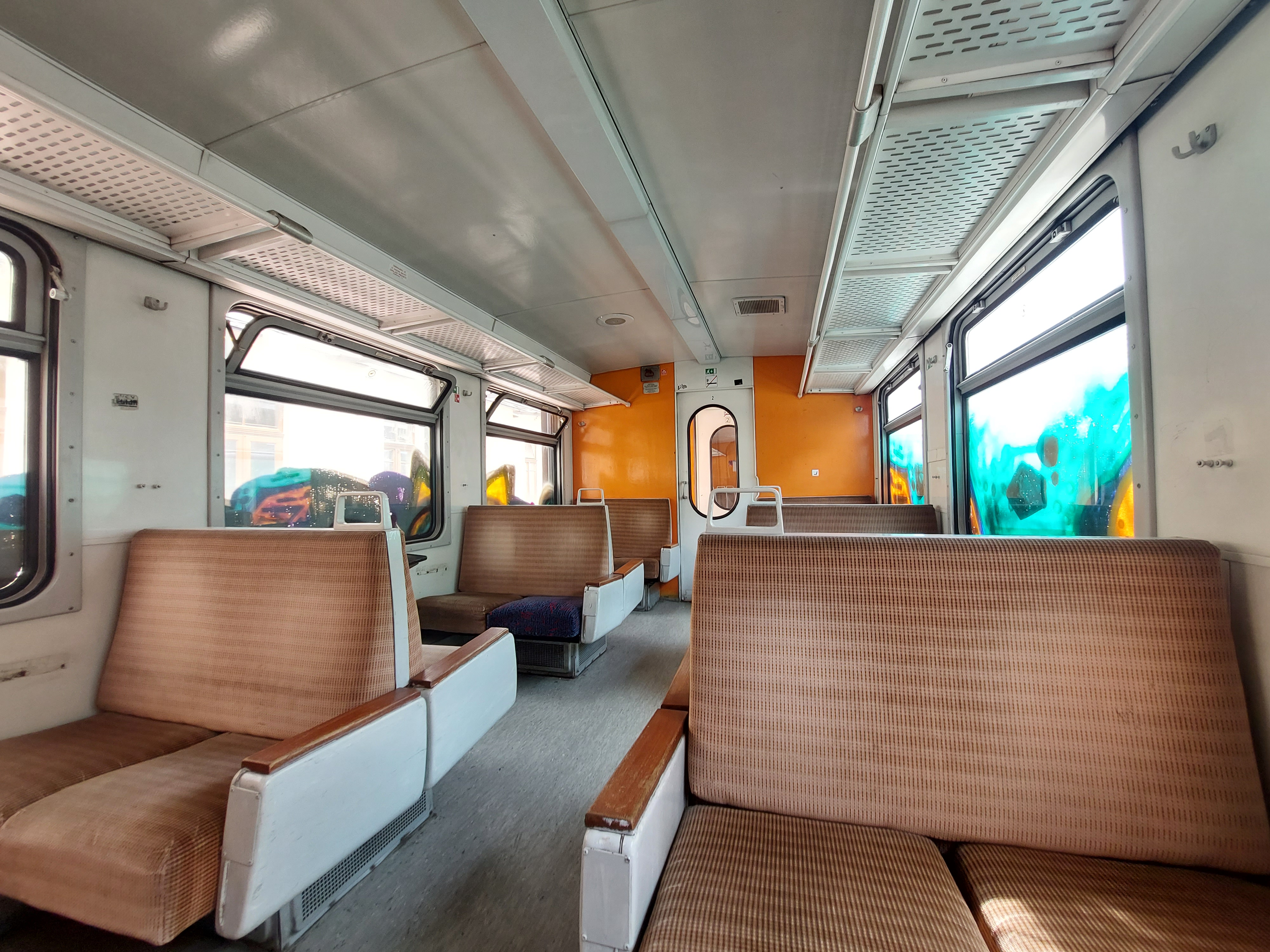
- Interior with original type of seating
- Stock type: Electric multiple unit
- Manufacturer: Ganz Mávag
- Constructed: 1976 – 1979
- Entered service: 1977
- Refurbished: 2002 – 2015
- Number built: 54 (24 to HŽ)
- Successor: HŽ 6112
- Formation: 4111 (cab car) + 6111 (power car) + 5111 (cab car)
- Fleet numbers: 6 111 004 – 6 111 025, 6 111 101 – 6 111 102

Specifications
- Train length: 72.41 m (237.6 ft)
- Doors: 6 sliding doors per side (6 111 0xx), 4 sliding doors per side (6 111 10x)
- Maximum speed: 120 km/h (75 mph)
- Weight: 145 t (320,000 lb)
- Power output: 1,200 kW (1,600 hp)
- Electric system(s): 250 A, 25 kV 50 Hz AC Catenary
- Current collection: Pantograph
- UIC classification: 2'2' + Bo'Bo' + 2'2'
- Coupling system: Scharfenberg
- Track gauge: 1,435 mm (4 ft 8 1/2 in)

The HŽ series 6111 is an electric multiple unit used by Croatian Railways (Croatian: hrvatske željeznice, HŽ), formerly the class JŽ 411 of ŽTP Zagreb during the period of Yugoslav Railways. The vehicles were built by Ganz Mávag, Hungary (production started in 1976). Most of the sets were later modernized by TŽV Gredelj between 2002 and 2015, including both interior and exterior modifications. They are popularly nicknamed Mađar (Hungarian) in reference to their country of origin.

The 6111 series EMUs are made of three cars: 4111 and 5111 unpowered cab cars that differ in types of electrical components contained, and the middle 6111 car that provides power to the trainset. The power car supplies power to the motors using a thyristor rectifier. The trains can be operated in sets of up to three units.

Between 1992 and the mid-2010s, the principal purpose of the units was to serve Zagreb Commuter Rail where they operated exclusively, in addition to some other electrified lines in short to medium distance from Zagreb. Between 2011 and 2023 the units have been fully replaced with the HŽ 6112 series on Zagreb suburban lines, so remaining 6111 sets were mostly returned to serve regional routes across the country.

Following the replacement of the electric traction system in the section Moravice - Rijeka - Šapjane (border with Slovenia) from 3 kV DC to 25 kV 50 Hz in 2012, the 6111 series was given the opportunity to operate on the lines between Zagreb and Rijeka, as well as suburban services from Rijeka.

Over the years, HŽ 6111 series units have had various modifications done, including the replacement of sliding side windows for tilting windows and the addition of exterior destination displays on the sides. Some units have had a more extensive modernization including the addition of a new exterior destination display on the front and interior renewal including new seats.

The 6111 series units are being gradually replaced with the 6112 series trains, although no set timeframe has been provided about their definite retirement.

A meter gauge version of this trainset was also produced for use on the Sahel Metro in Tunisia; these units were known as YZ-E sets. The trains have been retired in 2010 and replaced by newly-built Hyundai Rotem units.

== Gallery ==
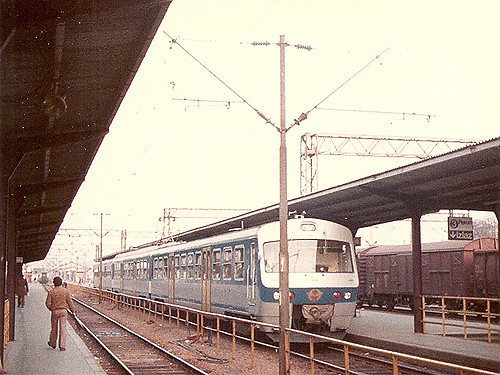
A Yugoslav Railways (JŽ) 411 series unit, some of which later became the HŽ 6111 series

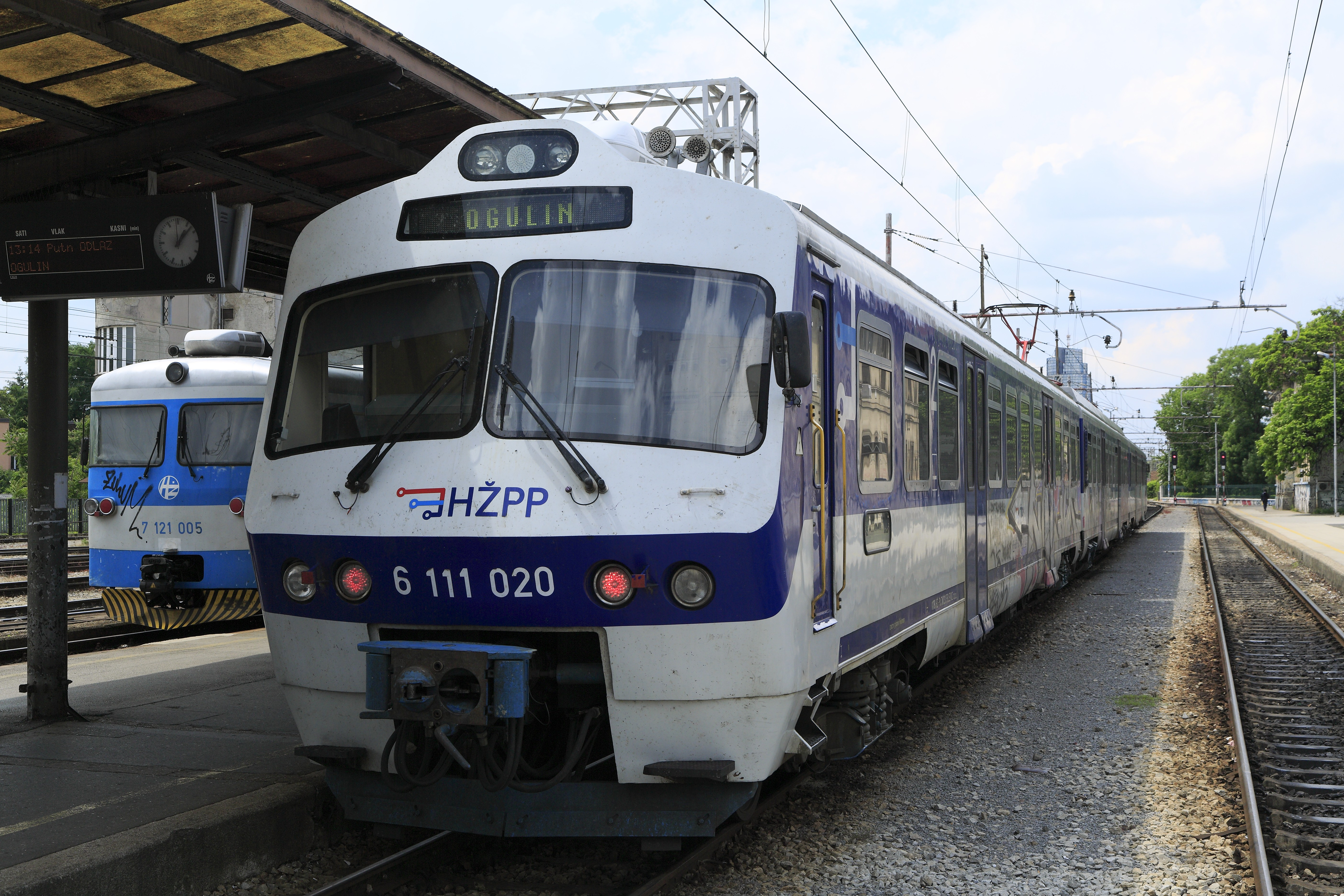
A HŽ 6111 series train that underwent modernization including a front exterior destination display

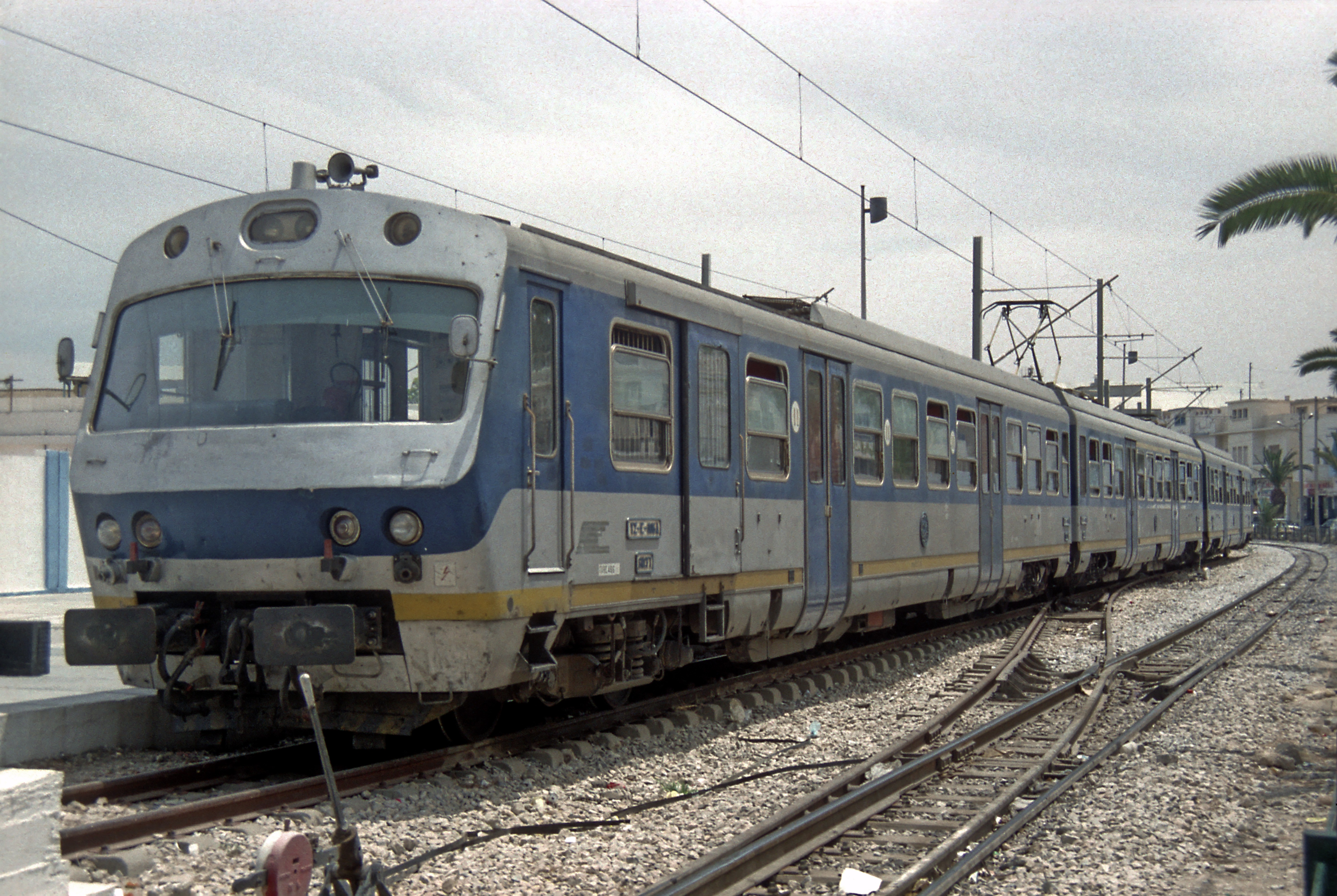
Sahel Metro YZ-E unit, a modified version also built by Ganz Mávag
