= List of honorary citizens of Zagreb =

Honorary citizenship of the City of Zagreb may be conferred on a person who is especially meritorious for promoting the values of a democratic society, historic events and traditions of the Croatian people, the status and reputation of the City of Zagreb, or its relations with other cities in the country and abroad, and for the development of the City or some of its particular duties, to a statesman or high-ranking official of another country, a member of an international or foreign organization, or its respective bodies, considered especially meritorious in respect of the City of Zagreb and the Republic of Croatia in promoting its sovereignty, independence and self-determination on the basis of generally accepted principles of the modern world.

The City Assembly decides on the conferment of honorary citizenship of the City.

== Honorary citizens of Zagreb ==
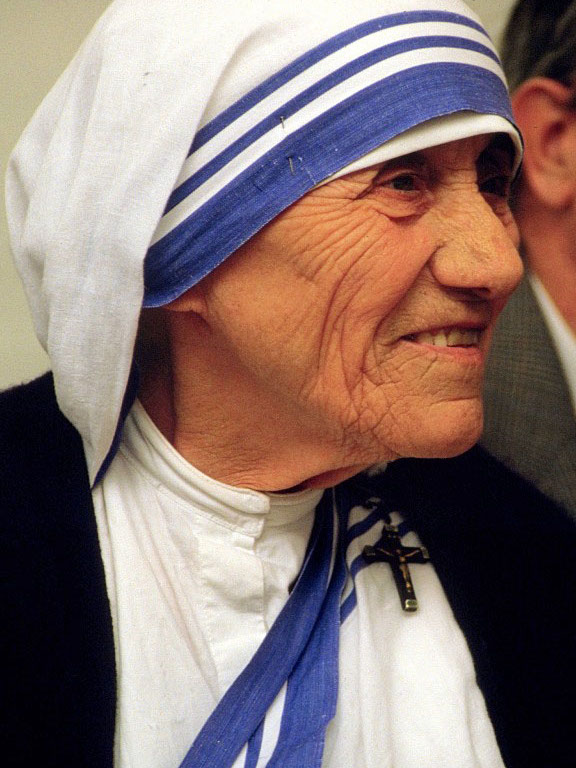
Blessed Mother Teresa is the first honorary citizen of Zagreb.

=== Austria-Hungary (1850–1918) ===
- Alexander von Bach (1853)
- Maximilian O'Donnell (1853)
- Josip Jelačić (1854)
- Josip Bunjevac (1854)
- Benedikt Lentulaj (1854)
- Josip Fluk (1854)
- Josip Bouffler (1854)
- Sima Manoilović (1854)
- Vuk Stefanović Karadžić (1861)
- Eugen Kvaternik (1869)
- Ladislav Pejačević (1880)
- Ivan Zajc (1880)
- August Šenoa (1881)
- Eugen Kumičić (1885)
- Đuro Daničić (1886)
- Ivan Benković (1890)
- Khuen Hedervary (1895)
- Dezső Bánffy (1895)
- Tadija Smičiklas (1900)
- Ivan Trnski (1903)
- Đuro Deželić (1906)
- Juraj Posilović (1908)
- Josip Juraj Strossmayer (1910)
- Svetozar Boroević (1916)
- Stjepan Sarkotić (1916)
- Šime Mazzura (1918)

=== Kingdom of Yugoslavia (1918–1941) ===
- Milan Amruš (1919)
- Vjekoslav Klaić (1922)
- Frane Bulić (1926)
- Vladimir Mažuranić (1927)
- Ljubo Babić Gjalski (1927)
- Dragutin Gorjanović-Kramberger (1927)
- Ante Bauer (1929)
- Theodor Wickerhauser (1934)

=== SFR Yugoslavia (1945–1990) ===
- Josip Broz Tito (1945)
- Vladimir Bakarić (1950)
- Miroslav Krleža (1960)
- Anka Berus (1980)
- Pavle Gregurić (1980)
- Ivan Krajačić (1980)
- Karlo Mrazović (1980)
- Mika Špiljak (1980)
- Forbes Burnham (1985)
- Javier Pérez de Cuéllar (1987)

=== Croatia (1990–present) ===
- Mother Teresa (1990)
- Franjo Tuđman (1992)
- Margaret Thatcher (1998)
- Dragutin Tadijanović (2000)
- Janica Kostelić (2005)
- Većeslav Holjevac (2008)
- Edo Murtić (2010)
