= Adolf Mošinsky =

Mayor of Zagreb (1843–1907)

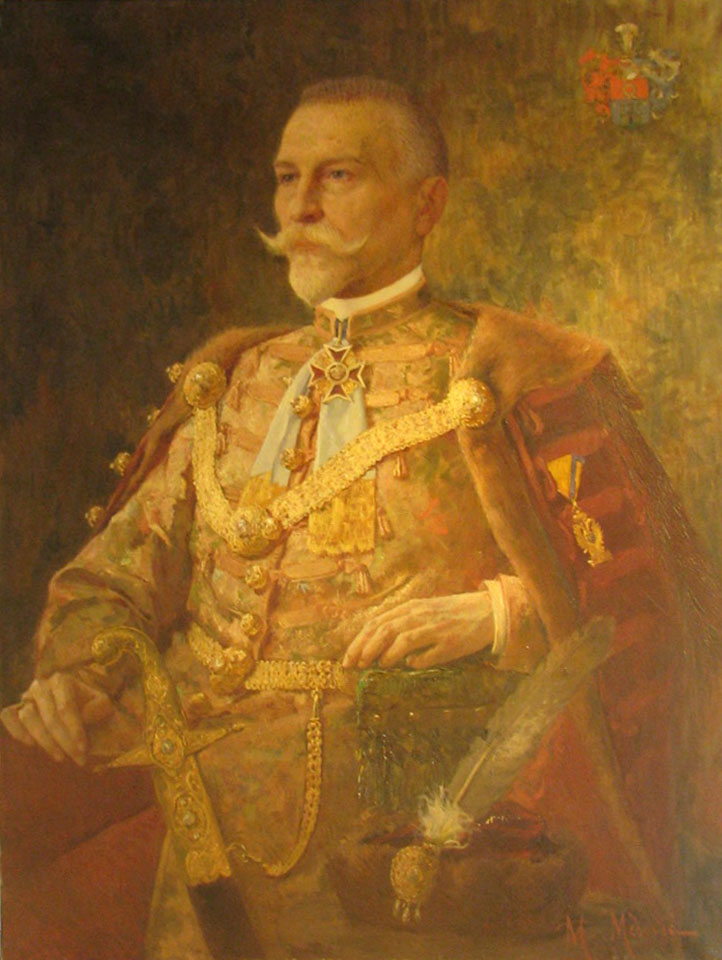
- Portrait of Adolf Mošinsky painted by Celestin Medović in 1906.

Mayor of Zagreb
- In office 20 June 1892 – 15 December 1904
- Preceded by: Milan Amruš
- Succeeded by: Milan Amruš

Personal details
- Born: 23 July 1843 Donji Miholjac, Kingdom of Slavonia, Austrian Empire
- Died: 18 July 1907 (aged 63) Zagreb, Croatia-Slavonia, Austria-Hungary

Adolf pl. Mošinsky (23 July 1843–18 July 1907) was a mayor of Zagreb from 1892 to 1904.

Mošinsky was born Adolphus Ignatius Joannes Nepomuk in Donji Miholjac. His father Ignatius was descended from the Nałęcz family of Poland (whose original name was Moszyński). His mother was Maria Rohrer. He finished gymnasium at the Classical Gymnasium in Zagreb in 1864, then continued his studies in Budapest and Vienna. In 1871 he married Justina Suplikatz (Šupljikac), with whom he had several children. He died in 1907 and is buried in Mirogoj Cemetery.

Mošinsky became mayor of Zagreb in 1892. One of his most important achievements was building the Zagreb sewer system from scratch and turning the Medveščak stream into an underground canal. During Mošinsky's term in office, many important cultural buildings such as the Croatian National Theater, the Mimara Museum, and the Art Pavilion were built. Mošinsky also saw the introduction of the Zagreb taxi, being the first passenger of driver Tadija Bartolović in 1901. By the end of Mošinsky's term in 1904, Zagreb had grown in size by 30 percent. After serving three consecutive terms, Mošinsky set a record in mayoring length (later to be broken by Milan Bandić).
