= Zagreb metropolitan area =

- Urban area
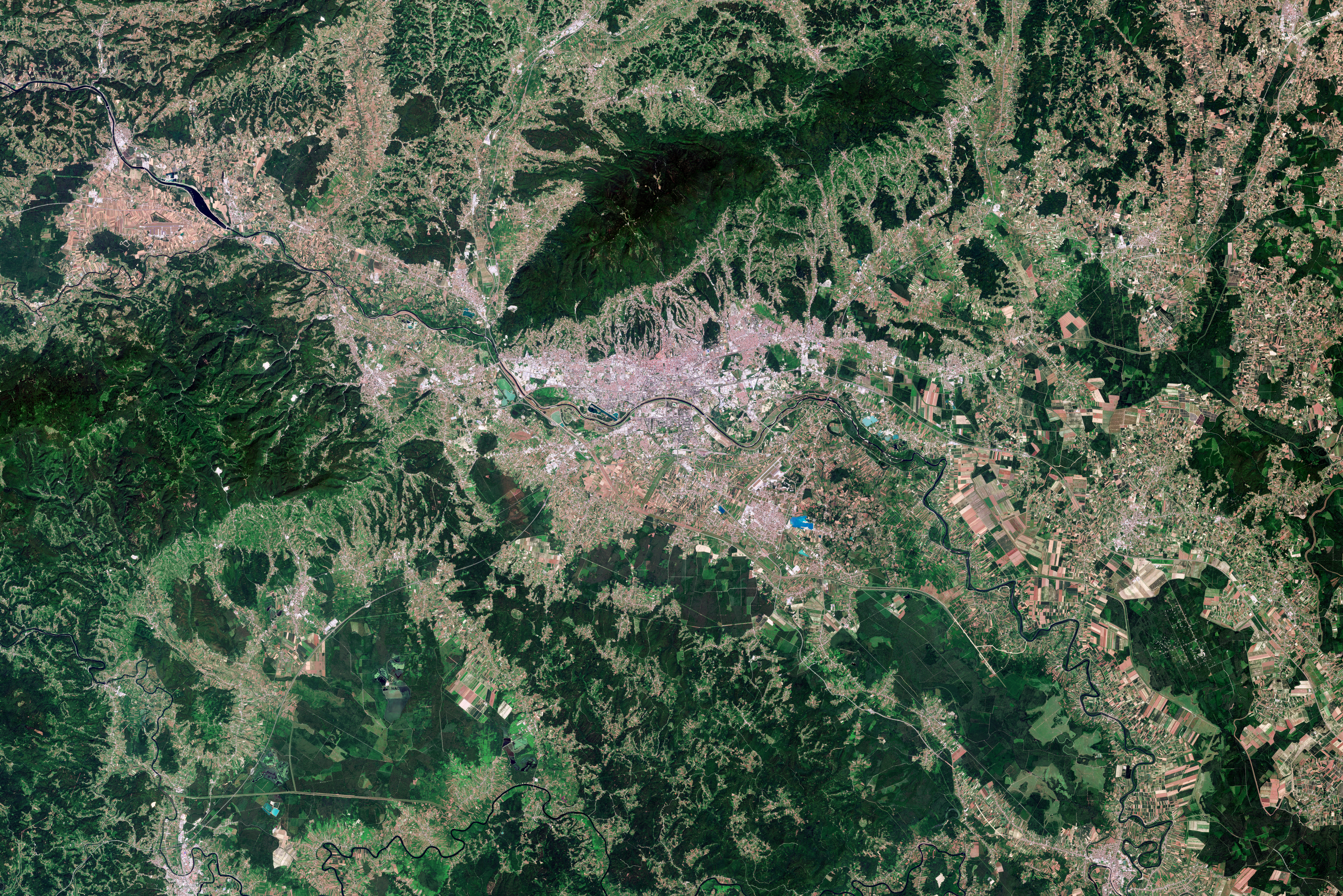
- Zagreb and metropolitan aera from satellite

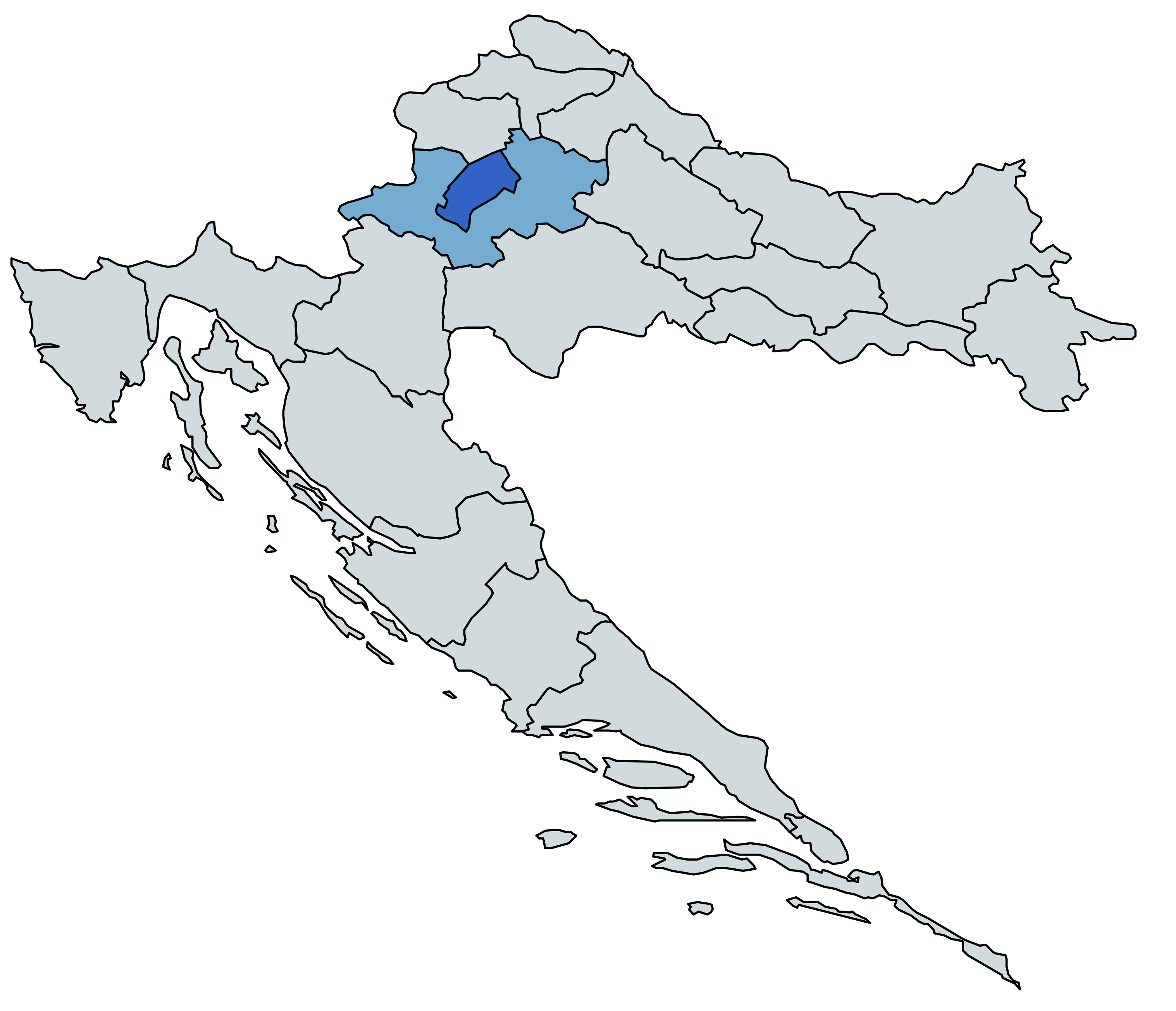
- Zagreb city (dark blue) and surrounding counties (light blue)
- Coordinates: 45.8131°N 15.9772°E
- Country: Croatia
- Largest city: Zagreb

Area
  - Metro: 2,826.5 km^{2} (1,091.3 sq mi)

Population
  - Metro: 1,086,528
  - Metro density: 384.41/km^{2} (995.61/sq mi)

GDP
  - Metro: €28.8 billion (2022)
- Time zone: UTC+1 (CET)

The Zagreb metropolitan area is the metropolitan area of Zagreb. The metropolitan area covers two counties in the Croatia (City of Zagreb and Zagreb county). The population is 1,086,528 as of 2022. It is the most populous metropolitan area in the country.

The largest cities or towns within the metropolitan area are Zagreb, Velika Gorica, Samobor, Dugo Selo, Jastrebarsko, Sv. Ivan Zelina, Brdovec, Sveta Nedelja and Zaprešić.

== Economy ==
In 2022, Zagreb's gross metropolitan product was around US$30 billion.

== Municipalities ==
Name	Population (2016)
City of Zagreb	790,017
Dugo Selo	17,466
Jastrebarsko	15,866
Samobor	37,633
Sveti Ivan Zelina	15,959
Sveta Nedelja	18,059
Velika Gorica	63,517
Zaprešić	25,223
Bistra	6,632
Brckovljani	6,837
Brdovec	11,134
Dubravica	1,437
Jakovlje	3,930
Klinča Sela	5,231
Kravarsko	1,987
Luka	1,351
Marija Gorica	2,233
Orle	1,975
Pisarovina	3,689
Pokupsko	2,224
Pušća	2,700
Rugvica	7,871
Stupnik	3,735
Donja Stubica	5,680
Oroslavlje	6,138
Marija Bistrica	5,976
Stubičke Toplice	2,805
Veliko Trgovišće	4,945
Total	1,086,528

== See also ==
- List of EU metropolitan areas by GDP
