= Homeland Bridge =

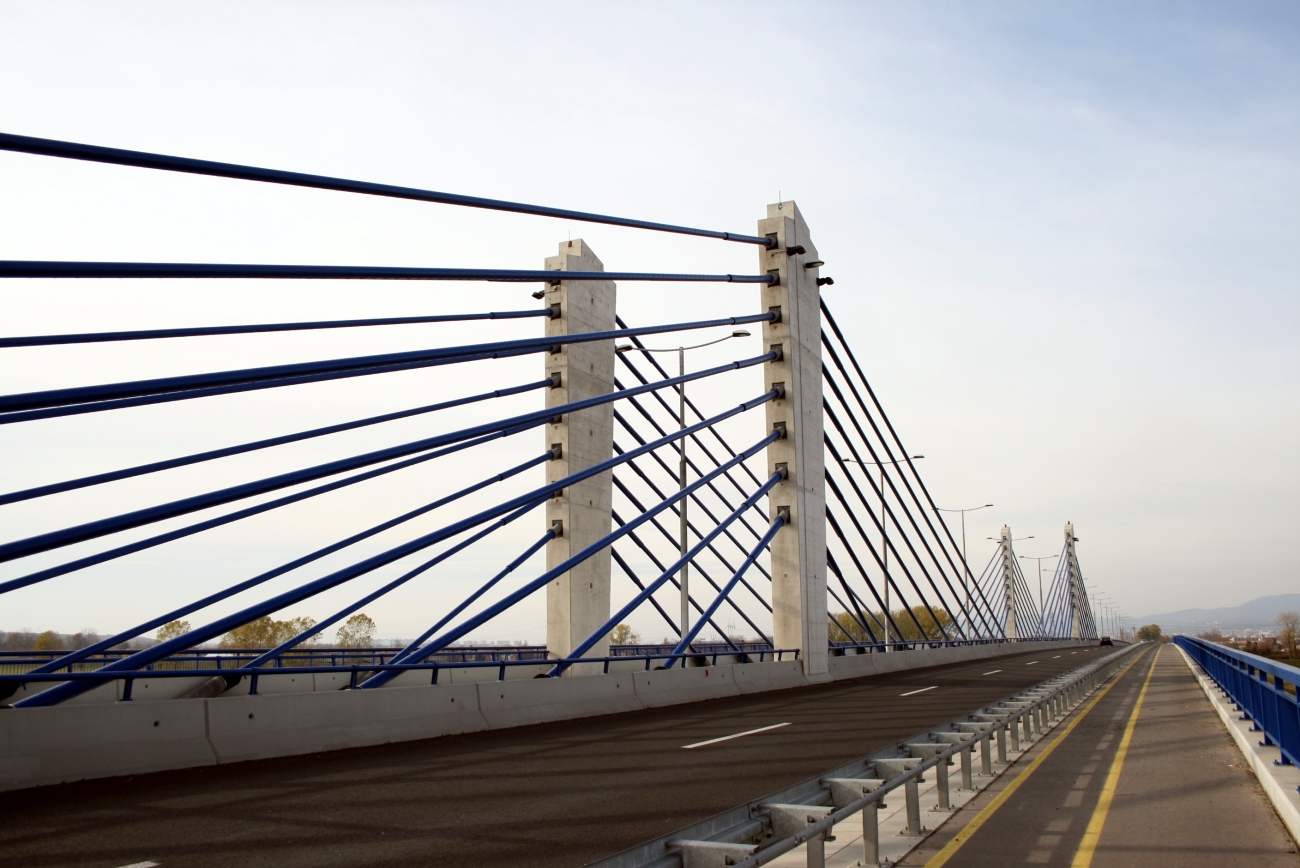
- Homeland Bridge, looking north
- Coordinates: 45°46′14″N 16°04′11″E
- Carries: Pedestrians, 4 lanes of traffic, space for 2 sets of railway tracks
- Crosses: Sava River
- Locale: Southeast Zagreb, Croatia
- Official name: Domovinski most

Characteristics
- Design: Extradosed bridge
- Total length: 840 m (2,756 ft)

History
- Opened: 5 May 2007

Homeland Bridge (Croatian: Domovinski most) is an 840-meter-long (2,756 ft) bridge over the Sava River located in southeastern Zagreb, Croatia. Its administrative location is the city district Peščenica - Žitnjak. The bridge carries four lanes connecting the Radnička street between the Petruševec neighborhood in the north and the Kosnica interchange with the Zagreb bypass in the south.

The bridge was built in the mid-2000s and opened in the spring of 2007 after numerous delays. It was formally opened by the Zagreb mayor Milan Bandić and the Minister of construction Marina Matulović-Dropulić.

The bridge is a part of a transportation project to improve and widen the connections of the satellite city Velika Gorica to Zagreb. Nevertheless, currently it alone does not achieve this goal, because the access road (Radnička street) towards it has remained narrow, pending reconstruction, and the road afterwards leads only towards the beltway, it does not continue towards Velika Gorica, to the dismay of local residents. The road is supposed to connect Kosnica and Velika Gorica and continue southwards along the route of the D31 state road.

The bridge has space reserved on the median for two light railroad tracks (intended for the proposed line to Zagreb Airport). It also carries the main sewer collector transporting sewage from southern boroughs to the treatment plant at Žitnjak.
