= HŽ series 6112 =

Class of 55 Croatian electric multiple units

HŽ 6112 / ŽFBH 4412
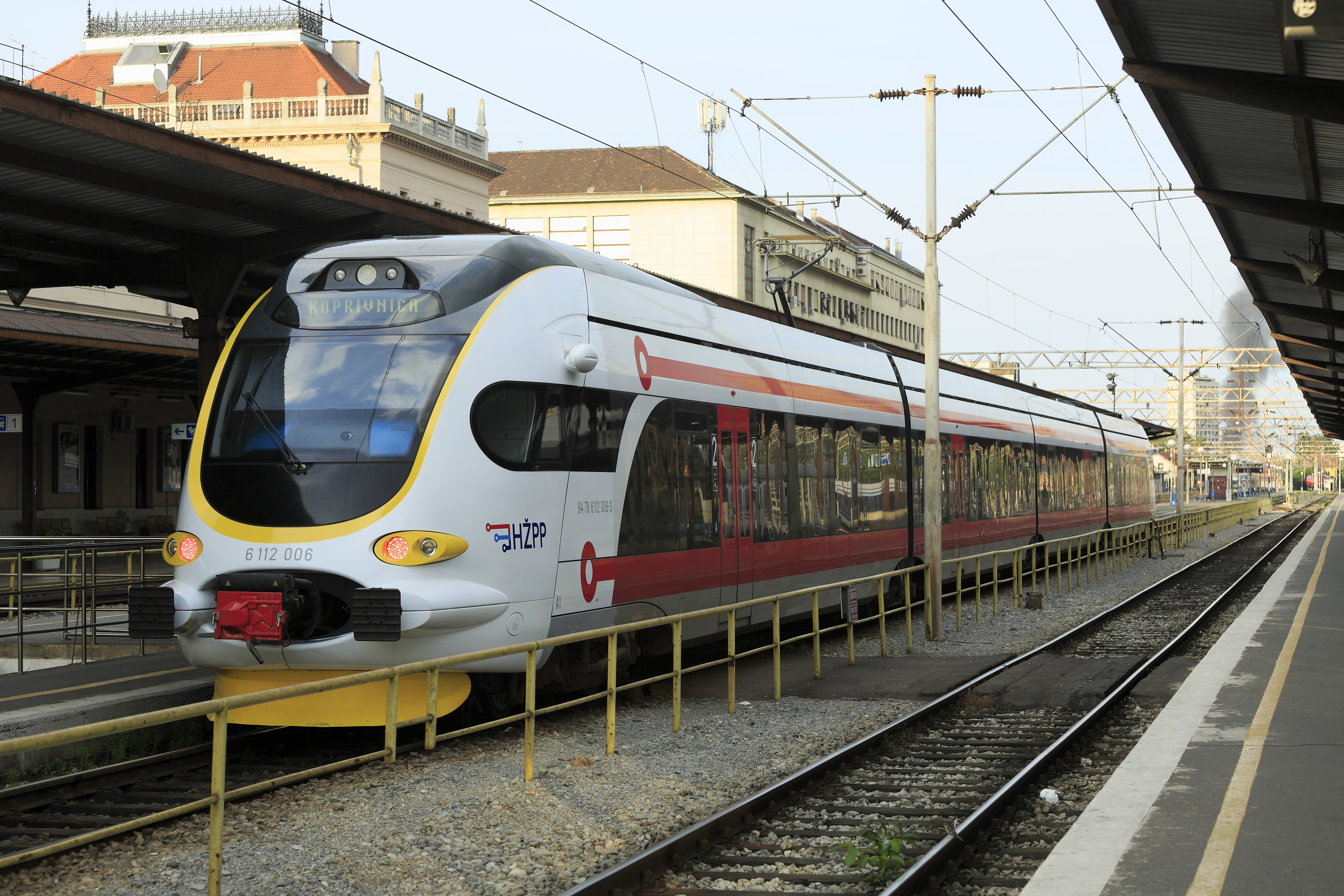
- Croatian Railways regional unit in Zagreb

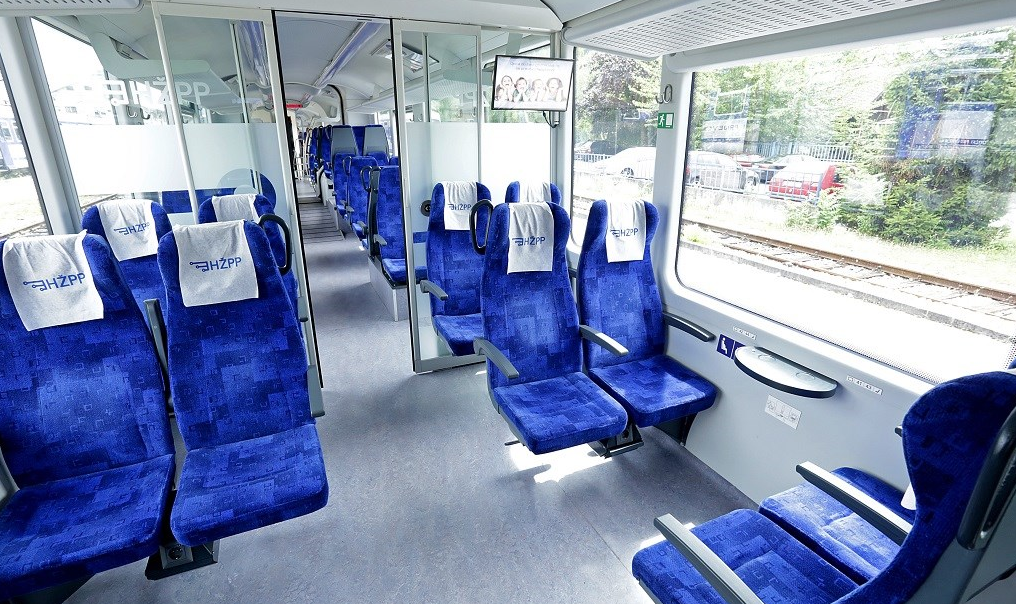
- Interior of regional unit from 1st class towards 2nd class
- Manufacturer: Končar - Electric Vehicles
- Constructed: 2011 – 2024
- Entered service: 2011
- Number built: 55
- Predecessor: Locomotive pulled consists, HŽ series 6111
- Fleet numbers: 6 112 001 – 6112 017, 6 112 101 – 6 112 117, 6 112 201 – 6 112 211, 6 112 301 – 6 112 310
- Operators: Croatian Railways; Railways of the Federation of Bosnia and Herzegovina

Specifications
- Train length: 75 m (246 ft)
- Width: 2,885 mm (9 ft 5 5/8 in)
- Height: 4,280 mm (14 ft 1/2 in)
- Floor height: 550 mm (1 ft 9 5/8 in)
- Doors: 4 doors (regional variant), 8 doors (suburban variant)
- Wheelbase: 2,700 mm (8 ft 10 1/4 in)
- Maximum speed: 160 km/h (99 mph)
- Traction system: IGBT inverter with three-phase asynchronous traction motors
- Power output: 2,000 kW (2,700 hp)
- Tractive effort: 200 kN (45,000 lb_{f})
- Acceleration: > 1 m/s^{2} (3.3 ft/s^{2})
- Deceleration: > 1.3 m/s^{2} (4.3 ft/s^{2})
- Electric system(s): 25 kV 50 Hz AC Catenary
- Current collection: Pantograph
- UIC classification: Bo'2'2'2'Bo'
- Coupling system: Scharfenberg
- Track gauge: 1,435 mm (4 ft 8 1/2 in)

HŽ series 6112 is a class of low-floor electrical multiple units manufactured by the Croatian company Končar - Electric Vehicles (Croatian: Končar - Električna vozila), operated by Croatian Railways (Croatian: hrvatske željeznice, HŽ) and the Railways of the Federation of Bosnia and Herzegovina. A total of 55 units were manufactured for Croatian Railways, with the first units being produced in 2011.

The Railways of the Federation of Bosnia and Herzegovina also ordered one intercity train, with no indication of ordering additional units. Croatian Railways operates their fleet on suburban, regional and InterCity routes.

The prototype made its first test run on the Zagreb – Dugo Selo line on July 3, 2011.

The construction, design and driving characteristics of the low-floor electric train enable optimized operations and improved passenger comfort on regional services depending upon the length of the route.

Passenger space is uniform along the entire train, without partitions and stairs. Floor height is optimal for 550 mm high platforms. Depending on the configuration, the trains are equipped with four doors (regional configuration) or eight doors (suburban configuration). All trains are equipped with air conditioning for both the driver's cab and passenger compartment.

The main frame is a four-part welded steel construction linked with joints. The body consists of aluminum sandwich panels and windows. All bogies are equipped with air suspension systems, and two side drive bogies, while three free bogies are of the Jacobs type.

Three-phase asynchronous traction motors, fed from an electronic IGBT inverter provide high acceleration at start-up and a maximum speed of 160 km/h. The steering and diagnostic system is a microprocessor system that links the train subsystems with modern communication protocols that allow for linking up to three trains into one.

== Sub-series (Croatian Railways) ==
Croatian Railways operates the following subseries of the 6112:

- Sub-series 6 112 0xx represents the units for regional services manufactured between 2011 and the first half of 2022. A total of 17 units were built.
- Sub-series 6 112 1xx represents the units for suburban services manufactured between 2011 and 2021. A total of 17 units were built.
- Sub-series 6 112 2xx represents the units for suburban services manufactured between the second half of 2022 and 2023. A total of 11 units were built.
- Sub-series 6 112 3xx represents the units for regional services manufactured between 2023 and 2024. A total of 10 units were built.

Sub-series 200 and 300 appear to be slightly different than those from initial sub-series (000 and 100), mainly involving minor differences in painting schemes and the curvature of the front.

Units painted with red stripes indicate regional units, while units with blue stripes indicate units with a suburban interior configuration. The prototype units have significantly different liveries, with the regional prototype unit (6 112 001) having a combination of white, gray and a red stripe and the suburban prototype unit (6 112 101) having a design close to the current suburban sub-series livery.

All sub-series are fully compatible with each other for mutual coupling while in service.

== Main characteristics of EMU (Electric Multiple Unit) ==
- bright, passenger-friendly interior with customized design
- end-to-end walk-through passenger compartment, with no steps
- up to 8 doors on each side for rapid passenger access
- air-conditioned passenger and driver compartments
- system for audio and video information for the passengers
- vacuum toilet-system, also suitable for disabled persons
- ergonomically designed driver's cab
- welded steel construction, glued aluminium sandwich panels
- glass-fibre reinforced front section with automatic coupling
- air-suspended bogies
- redundant traction chain with IGBT power converters
- microprocessor vehicle control system with train bus and diagnostic
- multiple-unit control of up to three vehicles
- providing of the free wireless internet (WiFi) to passengers

== Gallery ==
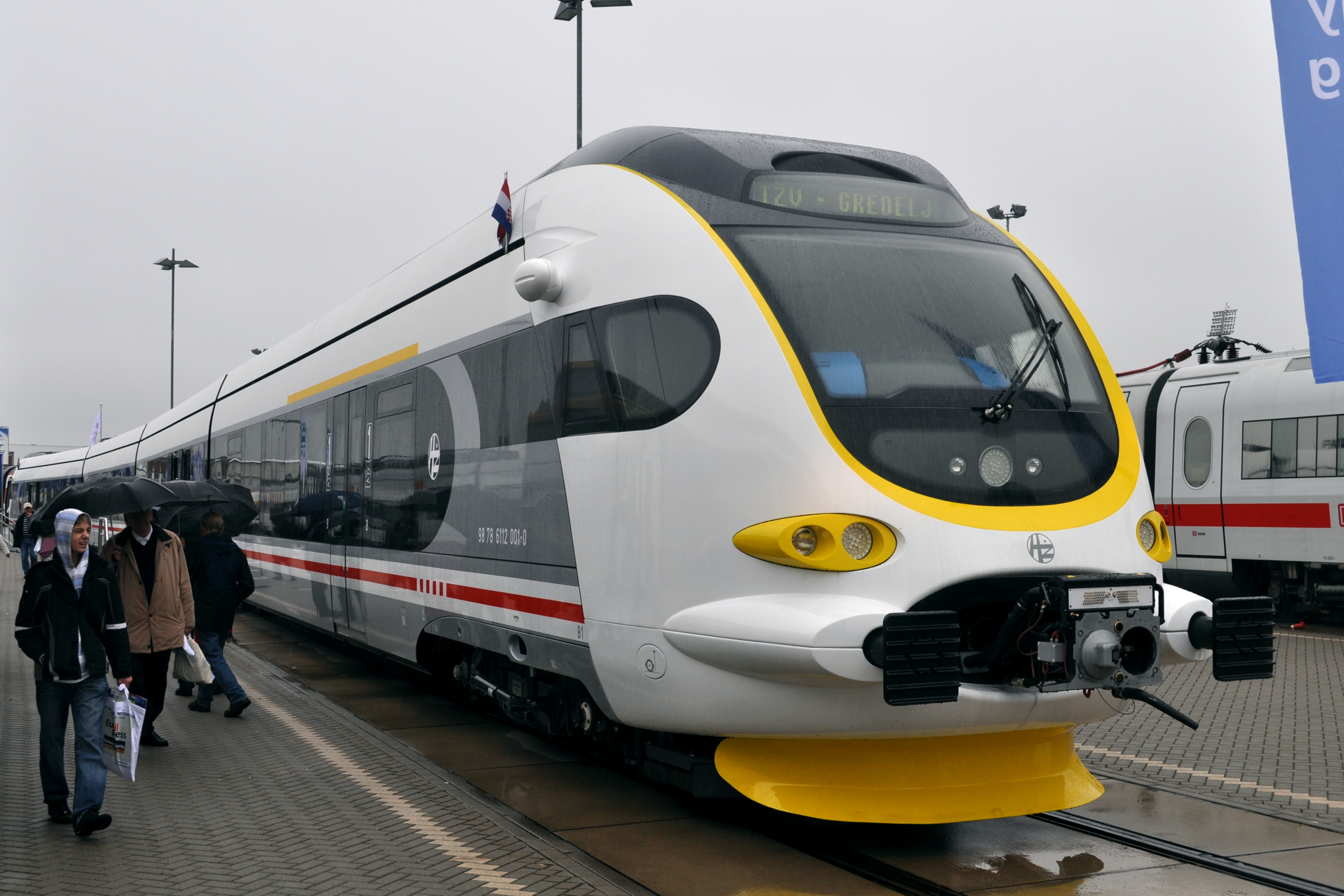
Regional prototype unit 6112 001 at Innotrans in Berlin

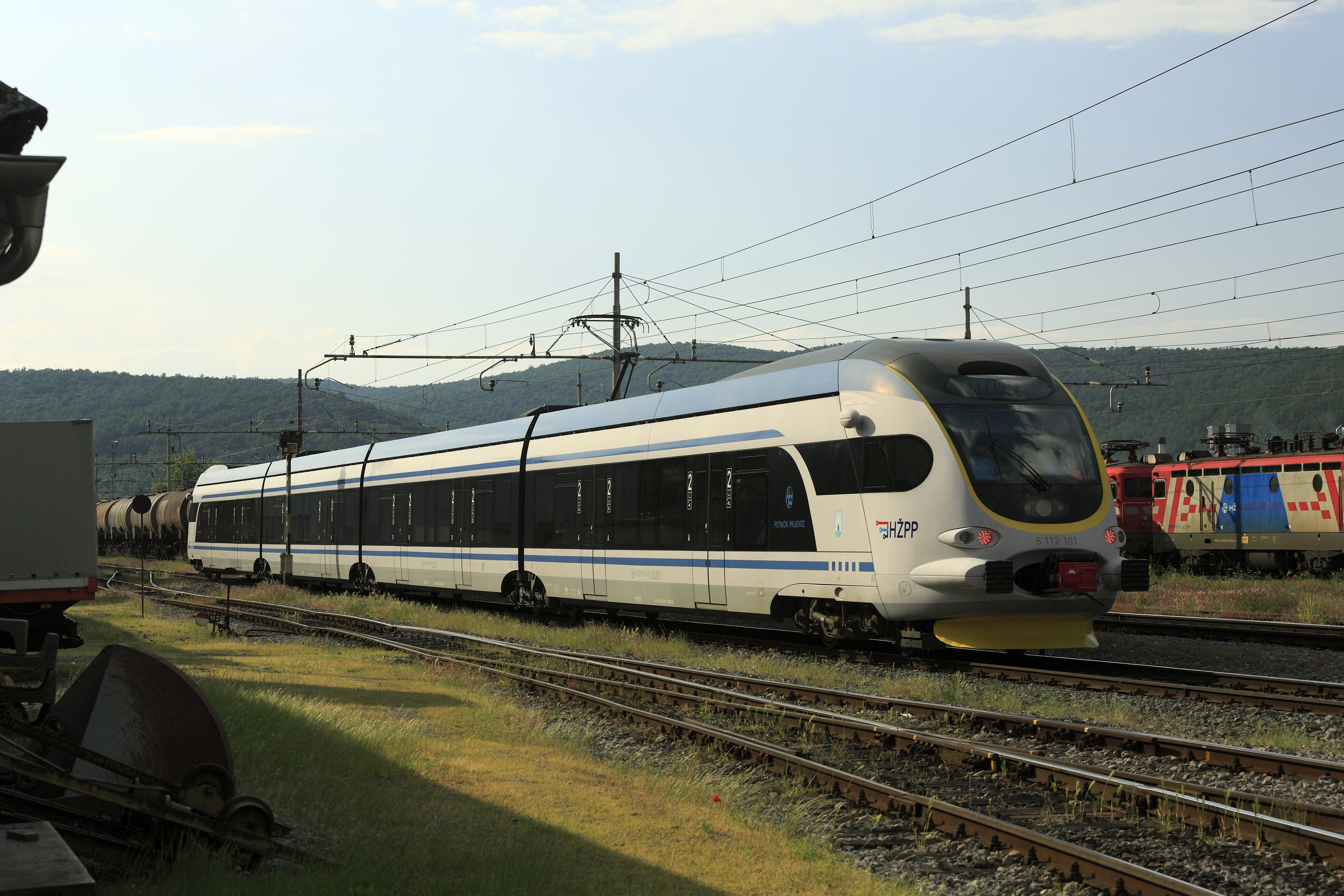
Suburban prototype unit 6112 101

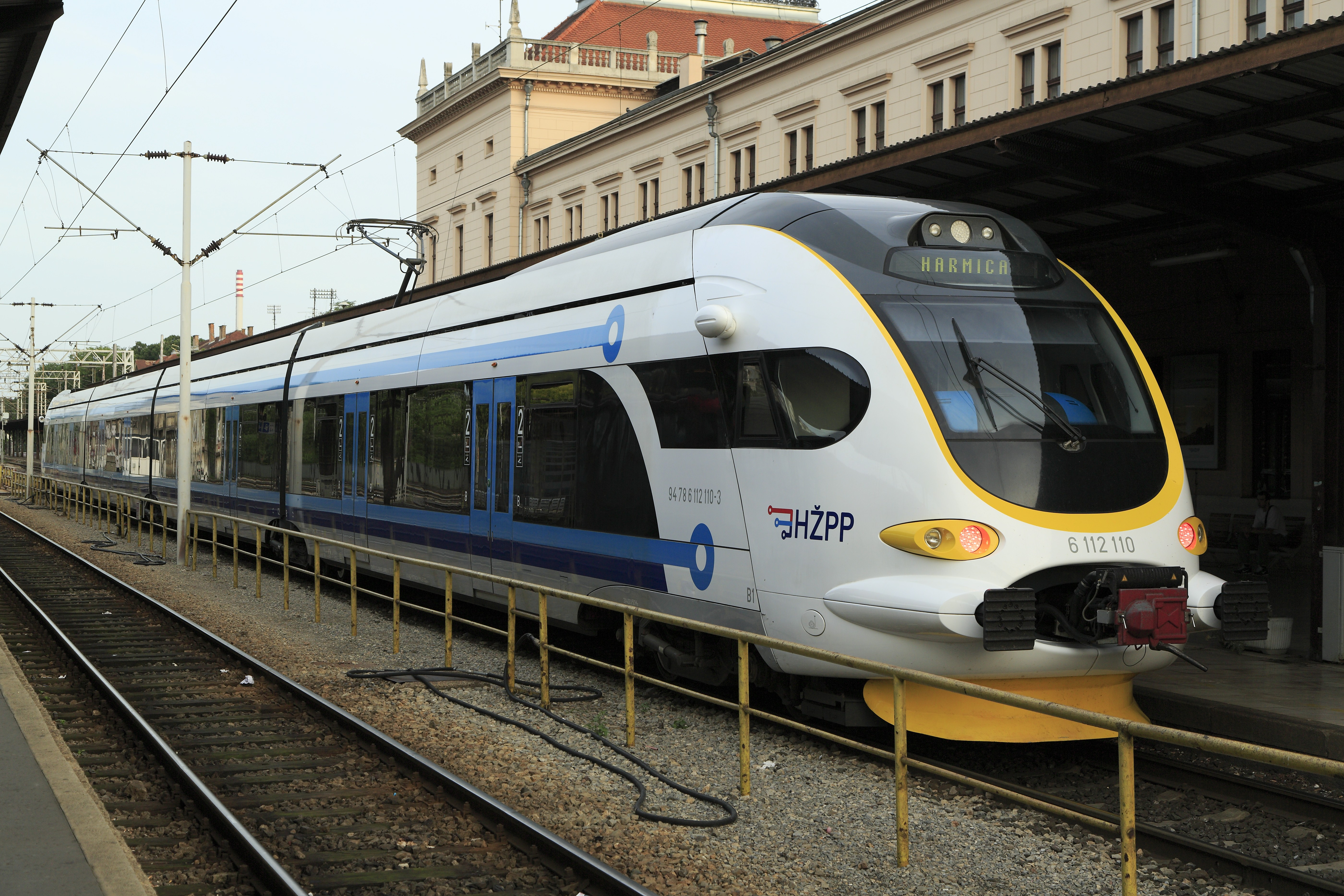
Production series suburban unit 6112 110
