= Maksimir (disambiguation) =

Maksimir is a district of Zagreb in Croatia.

Maksimir may also refer to:

- Maksimir Park, a park located in the Maksimir district
- Stadion Maksimir, a football stadium in the same district, home of Dinamo Zagreb
- NK Maksimir, a small football club in Zagreb
- ŽNK Dinamo-Maksimir, formerly known as ŽNK Maksimir, women's football club
