= Tomaš Mikloušić =

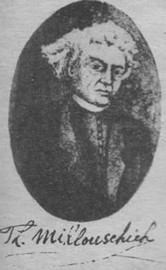
Portrait

Tomaš Mikloušić (24 October 1767 – 7 January 1833) was a Croatian writer, publisher and translator. As one of the forerunners of the Illyrian movement, he produced a large and varied body of work during his lifetime. He also served as professor of grammar and poetics at the Classical Gymnasium in Zagreb (1805–1832) and ran various periodicals.

In 1791, he wrote Imenoslavnik, a mythological-allegorical play, performed at the theatre of the Zagreb seminary that same year, which remains in manuscript. Here the first use of the modern Croatian word 'igrokaz' (a folk play, or play for children) is attested, possibly coined by Mikloušić himself. He later wrote similar pieces such as Huta pri Savi (1822). However, his most important work is called Izbor dugovanj vsakoverstneh za hasen i razveselenje služečeh (1822), a kind of poetic encyclopedia divided in four parts.

He published drama works in Kajkavian, both original such as those of Tituš Brezovački, but also translated ones, such as Ljubomirovič ili prijatel pravi, a translation of Goldoni by Matija Jambrić. He is also one of the first Croatian biographers.

Towards the end of his life, he was assigned to translate the Bible into Croatian by the Bishop of Zagreb, Maksimilijan Vrhovac. He died on 7 January 1833, in Jastrebarsko.
