= Bukovac, Zagreb =

Neighbourhood of Zagreb, Croatia

Bukovac
- Neighbourhood
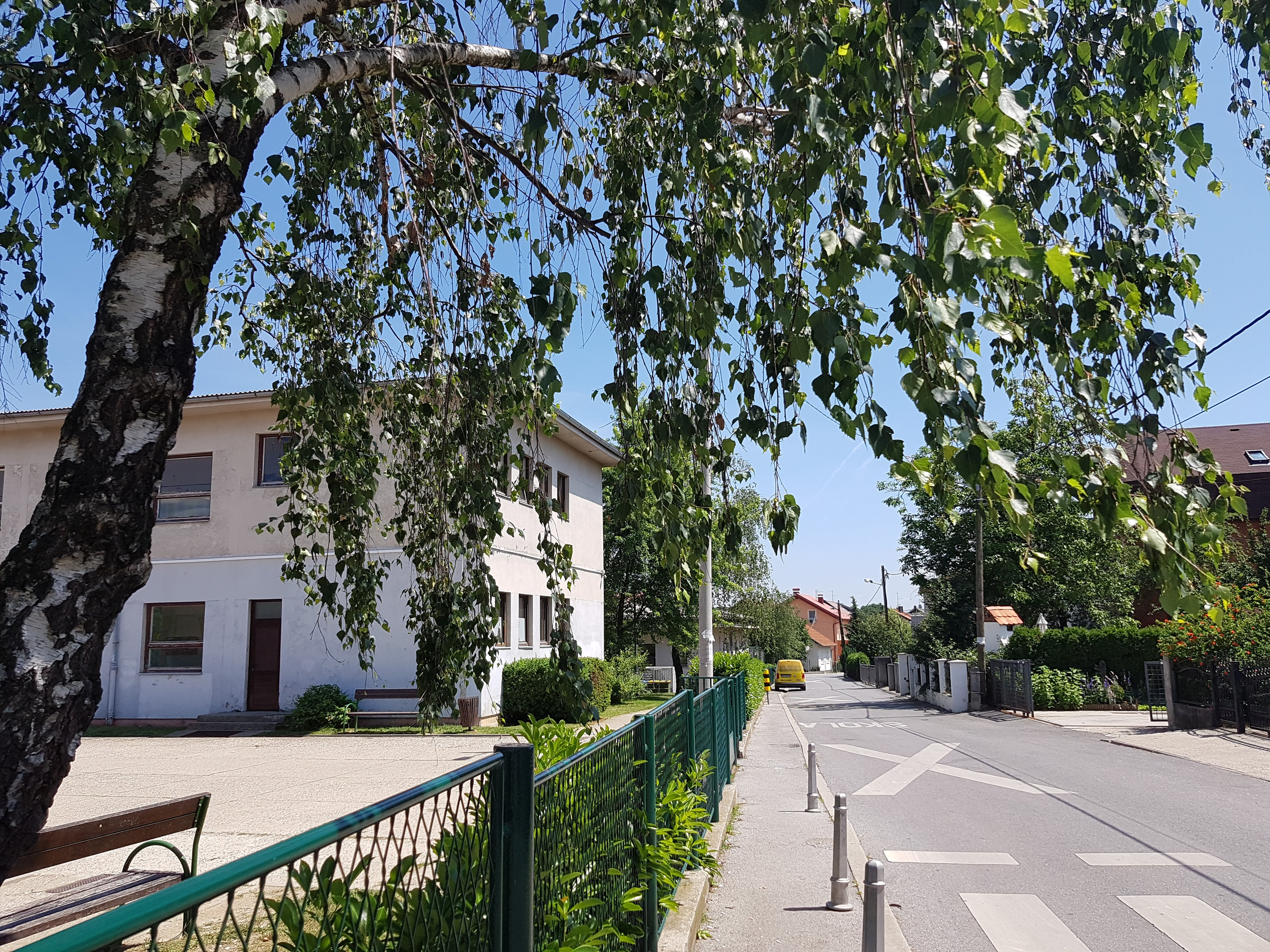
- View of a street in Bukovac
- Interactive map of Bukovac
- Coordinates: 45°50′22″N 16°00′41″E
- Country: Croatia
- City: Zagreb
- District: Maksimir

Population (2021)
  - Total: 6,658

Bukovac or Bukovec (kajk.) is a neighbourhood in the northeast of Zagreb, Croatia, within the Maksimir district. The area of the local city council of Bukovac has a population of 6,658 (census 2021).

The area was integrated into the city of Zagreb in the latter half of the 20th century.

The neighbourhood encompasses the Bukovac street, while the nearby Bukovačka street (adjectival form of Bukovac) is instead part of the local councils of Maksimir and Remete.
