= Cultural centers of Zagreb =

Network of institutions in Zagreb, Croatia

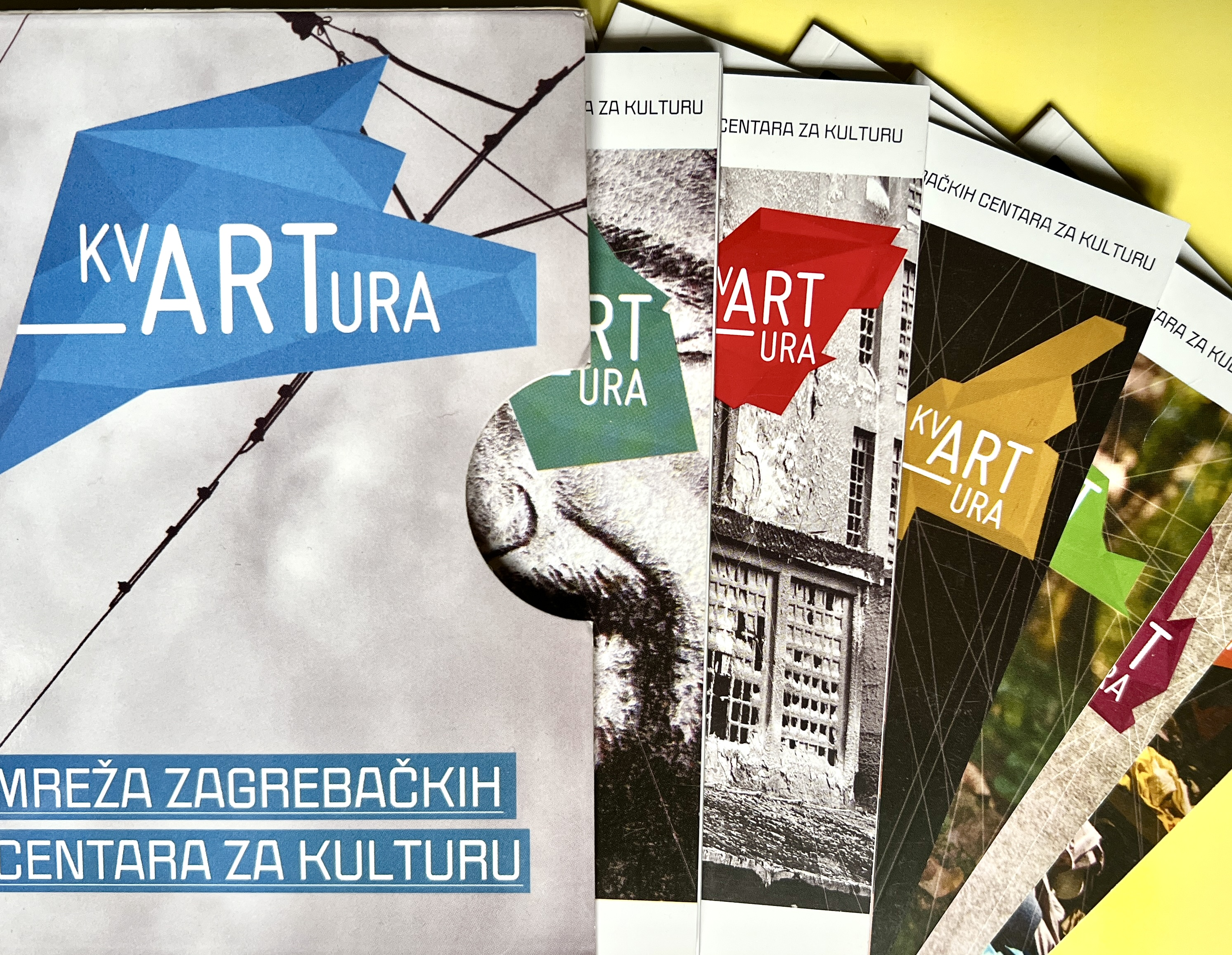
KvARTura, 2012 program catalogs of the network of Zagreb cultural centers

Cultural centers of Zagreb (Croatian original: Centri za kulturu Grada Zagreba) are municipal cultural institutions founded or co-founded by the City of Zagreb as regulated by the law and finnanced mostly from the city budget.

Their activities and content of program are diverse, covering numerous areas of art and culture from amateur to educational activities and workshops. Cultural centers are institutions spread across Zagreb, each with a unique structure and program, offering a large number of cultural activities and content in the field of culture and arts, but also leisure and education.

New pilot project Zagreb Cultural Neighborhoods aims at revitalizing cultural offerings of samo of the underserved neighborhoods and as a support for existing Cultural Centers and their activities. It is organized by the Novi prostori kulture - Center for cultural and social development, through support of the City of Zagreb.

== History ==
Cultural centers in Zagreb have been established since the beginning of the 20th century, following European trends and ideas for the development of democratic cultural policies of inclusive and accessible cultural programing to all citizens.

In the 1980s, there were around 111 cultural centres, community centres and youth centres in Zagreb, which were not connected into a single network of cultural centres. Today, there are 11 independent cultural centres and 2 institutions organised as folk universities (Dubrava and Sesvete) in Zagreb. In addition to cultural programmes, there are also educational activities, such as foreign language schools, music schools and other educational programmes. Over the past fifteen years, the centres have played a major role in the decentralisation of cultural production and supply, and are, alongside libraries, the only bearers of cultural activities at the local level. Since 1994, the founding rights over the centres and folk universities have been exercised by the City of Zagreb.

After World War II, in the period from 1948 to 1958, the National Costume Loan - today part of the Travno Cultural Center, the August Cesarac Cultural Center - today the August Cesarac Cultural and Film Center, the Ribnjak Cultural Center - today the Ribnjak Youth Center, the Peščenica Cultural Center - KNAP and the Dubrava People's University were founded. This was followed by the establishment of the International Center for Cultural Services in 1972 - today part of the Travno Cultural Center and the Trešnjevka Cultural Center - CeKaTe in 1978.

The policy of establishing public cultural centers continued in the 2000s, and in 2008 the Zagreb Independent Center for Culture and Youth - Pogon was founded. The Histrionski dom Cultural Center was founded in 2016. In 2017, the Center for Promoting Tolerance and Preservation of Holocaust Remembrance was established.

== Development ==
In 2023, the City of Zagreb, in addition to significantly increase of financial support for existing programs and actors in culture, also initiated the establishment of the Centre for Cultural and Social Development New Culture Spaces (led by Hrvoje Laurenta), which works on innovative and development projects towards the capillar distribution of cultural programming and citizen participation, as well as the development of new infrastructures (which do not have functional cultural centers and/or even cultural infrastructure in general. Infrastructural quantitative and qualitative development for cultural needs includes a large number of projects, the largest of which is the new Central City Library and the Paromlin Social and Cultural Center.

== Centers and focuses/activities ==
=== Ribnjak Youth Center (Centar mladih Ribnjak) ===
After World War II in Zagreb, a so called dairy restaurant for children operated on the site of the present-day Center, which in 1953 grew into the first Home of pioneers, and in 1979, after a major renovation, it became the center we know today.

A branch of the Ribnjak Youth Center is Scena Ribnjak, which brings together independent performing artists and organizations. In cooperation with the Rock Academy, the Center provides music education to young people. Programs are aimed at using the free time of children and youth, and amateur music and drama are particularly developed, as is cooperation with associations whose work is related to socially sensitive content that improves the lives of young people.

The Center has several halls, a club, a music room, and a functional roof terrace. Some of the workshops and programs include the Klinci s Ribnjak choir, Afrobigs and Afrokids - workshops on African culture, Drama studio, Ritmika, Vezilje i Poezije, and Jednaki u kulturi. Since 2002, the Center has been implementing an artist residency program in the form of six-month, one-year, and two-year programs.

=== Cultural Center in Peščenica - KNAP (Centar kulture na Peščenici - KNAP) ===
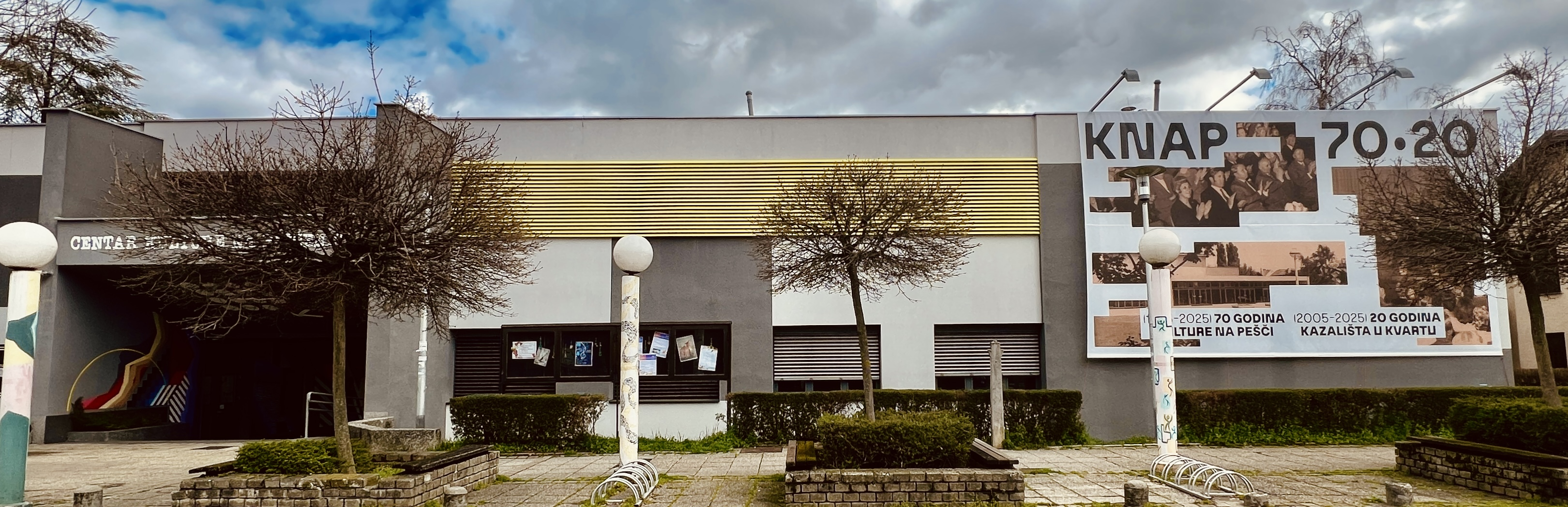
KNAP in 2025 with anniversary promo

This Center was founded in 1955, and since then it has been implementing programs in the field of culture and education for children, youth, adults and the elderly. The Center's activities are related to the area of Peščenica, Žitnjak and beyond.

The Center includes the Događanja (Events) Gallery, founded in the 1980s, and the KNAP Theater, founded in 2005 and still perceived as new, bold and unconforming. During the 1980s, numerous eminent artists exhibited at the Gallery, initiators of research and new ways of expression on the contemporary Croatian art scene.

The Center's programs are focused on maintaining visual culture programs, professional theater production by KNAP, amateur theater, theater festivals, creating free time for children and youth, cultural programs for the local community, urban and youth art culture. In addition to regular activities and workshops, they organize special events and programs in the fields of music, visual culture, literature, and dance, including: Musical KNAP, Art by KNAP; Pešča Chillout, Knapanje, Knap's literary party, Volim Pešču, KNAP in the neighborhood, Dance waves.

=== Dubrava Cultural Center - People's University Dubrava (Centar kulture Dubrava - Narodno sveučilište Dubrava) ===
Institution was founded in 1958 to offer cultural activities to the residents of the Dubrava district. To this day, it is a focal point of cultural life at the local level with numerous programs, including reading and learning courses, a folklore playroom, children's folklore, ceramics courses, a sculpture workshop, a small school of applied arts, illustration and comics, a cartoon school, drawing and painting programs, a workshop for straw and rush crafts, lace-making education, music courses and workshops, dance and recreation courses, as well as lifelong learning. Among the events, the Days of Dubrava stand out. The Dubrava Children's Theater, the Vladimir Filakovac Gallery, the Dubrava Photo Gallery and the Kontrast Gallery operate within the People's University Dubrava.

=== Sesvete Cultural Center - People's university Sesvete (Centar za kuturu Sesvete - Narodno sveučilište Sesvete) ===
This cultural and educational institution was founded in 1959 and organizes cultural and artistic programs for all ages. Specially developed are art and music programs, verified music programs (music school), actions and events for the local community, cooperation with institutions for children with special needs, recreational and educational programs for adults, inter-county cooperation, and cultural and artistic amateurism.

=== Cultural Information Centre (Kulturno informativni centar - KIC) ===
The Cultural Information Centre - KIC was founded in 1965, under the name of the Zagreb Culture and Information Centre. It was created as an expression of the city of Zagreb's need to discuss relevant contemporary events, cultural policy and cultural creativity in cooperation with the public. It has been operating under the name KIC - Cultural Information Centre since 1984. With a variety of programs, including forums, lectures, exhibitions, film screenings, publishing activities, music listening rooms and a reading room, the KIC acts as an important information point for events and trends in the city's culture.

The Forum Gallery, founded in 1969, founded by prominent Croatian artists, operates as part of the KIC. In 2001 the Forum Gallery Award was established.

=== Center for Fine Art Education of the City of Zagreb (Centar za likovni odgoj Grada Zagreba) ===
The Center for Fine Art Education of the City of Zagreb was founded in 1972, in the former house of the academic painter Jozo Kljaković, in Rokov Perivoj. The center holds courses in drawing, painting, sculpture and ceramics, and takes care of the Memorial Collection of Jozo Kljaković and preserves his numerous works. The programs are aimed at adult fine art education.

=== Cultural Center Travno and Center for Traditional and Cultural Heritage (Centar za tradicijsku i kulturnu baštinu) ===
The center began operating in 1972. Until 2013, the official name of the center was the International Center for Cultural Services (MCUK), and today it operates under the name Cultural Center Travno (Kulturni centar Travno - KCT). One of the primary activities is the orientation of the program towards puppetry programs, the most famous of which is the International Puppet Theater Festival Zagreb - PIF, which has been held since 1968.

Cultural Center Travno is a local center for creative leisure time for children, youth, and adults; with musical and theatrical performances for both children and adults.

Within the framework of a specialized institution, the Center for Traditional and Cultural Heritage (originated as Folk Costume Loan Center and Workshop - Posudionica narodnih nošnji); founded in 1948, activities of collecting, lending, reconstructing, and professional protection of folk costumes are carried out. In terms of its type of activity, this Loan Institution is a unique institution in the Republic of Croatia.

=== Maksimir Culture and Information Center (Centar za kulturu i informacije Maksimir) ===
The programs of this Center are aimed at the creative use of children and youth's free time, particularly in the amateur music and drama. Due to the location and proximity to Maksimir Park, education is also focused on environmental care and permaculture.

=== Novi Zagreb Cultural Center (Centar za kulturu Novi Zagreb) ===
The Novi Zagreb Cultural Center was founded in 1977. During the Croatian War of Independence, the premises were used as a base for the Novi Zagreb Crisis Staff. In March 1992, the Center organized the first humanitarian concert for the children of fallen Croatian veterans at the Zagreb Fair.

The work of the Center today is focused on cooperation with the local community, especially schools, creating ethno and eco programs, programs in the field of amateur art, concerts of classical music, traditional culture, theater performances, actions and events in culture. Exhibition activities are carried out as part of the work of the Vladimir Bužančić Gallery. In cooperation with counties and cities throughout Croatia, guest appearances of Croatian artists abroad are organized.

=== Trešnjevka Cultural Center (Centar za kulturu Trešnjevka - CeKaTe) ===
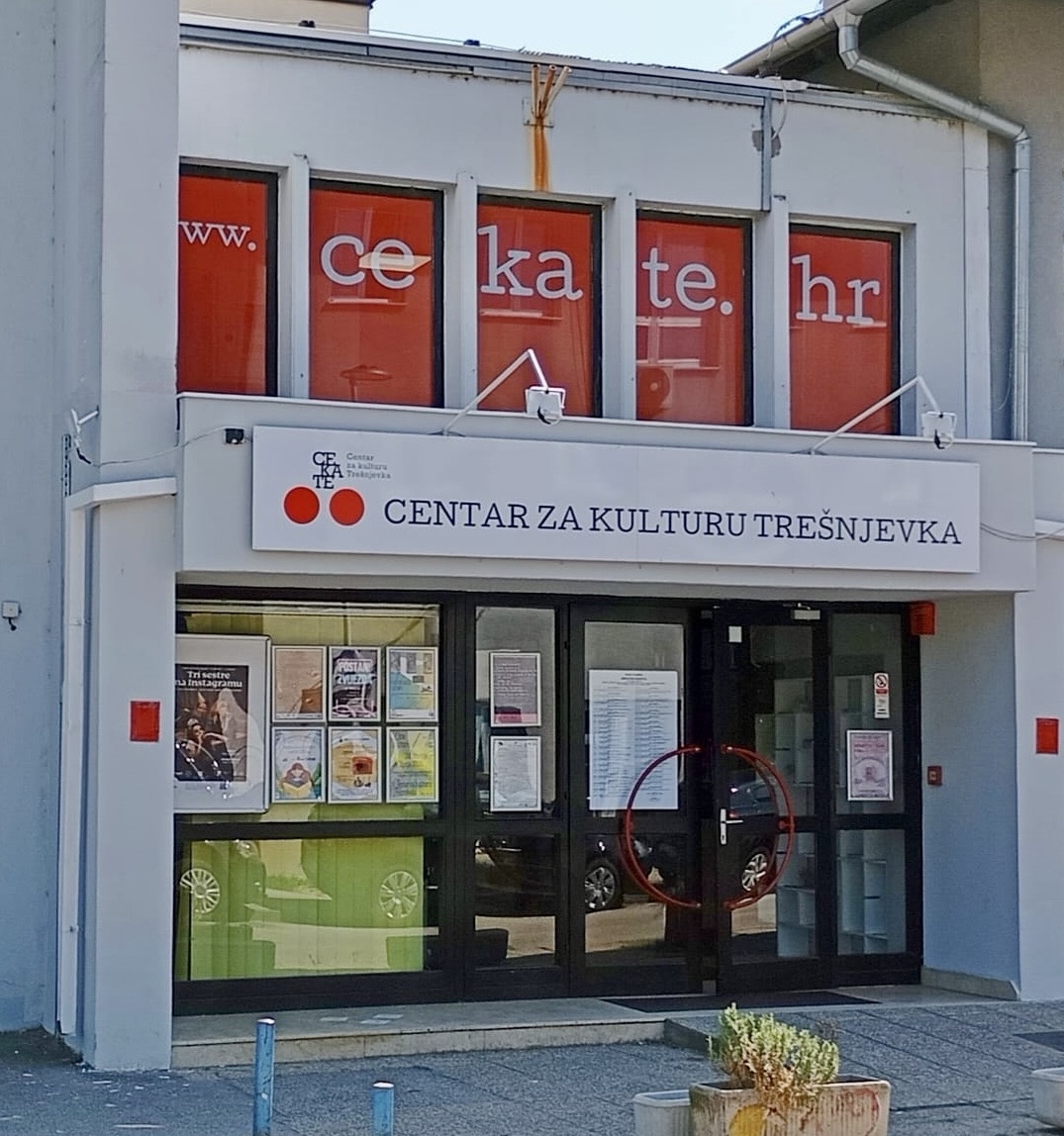
CeKaTe entrance in 2025.

The Trešnjevka Cultural Center - CeKaTe is the city's coordination center for event programs, inter-county cooperation, programs for music and dance amateurs, promotion of socio-cultural projects and programs for the local community, development of theater pedagogy programs, gallery activities for the presentation and valorization of architectural, urban and design projects (programs are aimed at improving the quality of life). Programs are realized at following infrastructure units: the Zagreb Music Stage, the Trešnjevka Dance Stage, the Modulor Gallery, the Trešnjevka Theater, and the Prečko Cultural Center.

=== Susedgrad Culture and Education Center (CZKIO Susedgrad) ===
The Center was founded in 1977, and its activities focus on ecological topics and environmental protection, traditional culture programs, cultural programs for the local community, gallery and multimedia activities. In addition to regular activities, the Center organizes events and activities such as the Gajnice vrište program, Stenjevac Days, Veljača prevrtača, Susedgrad fest.

=== POGON - Zagreb's Center for Independent Culture and Youth ===
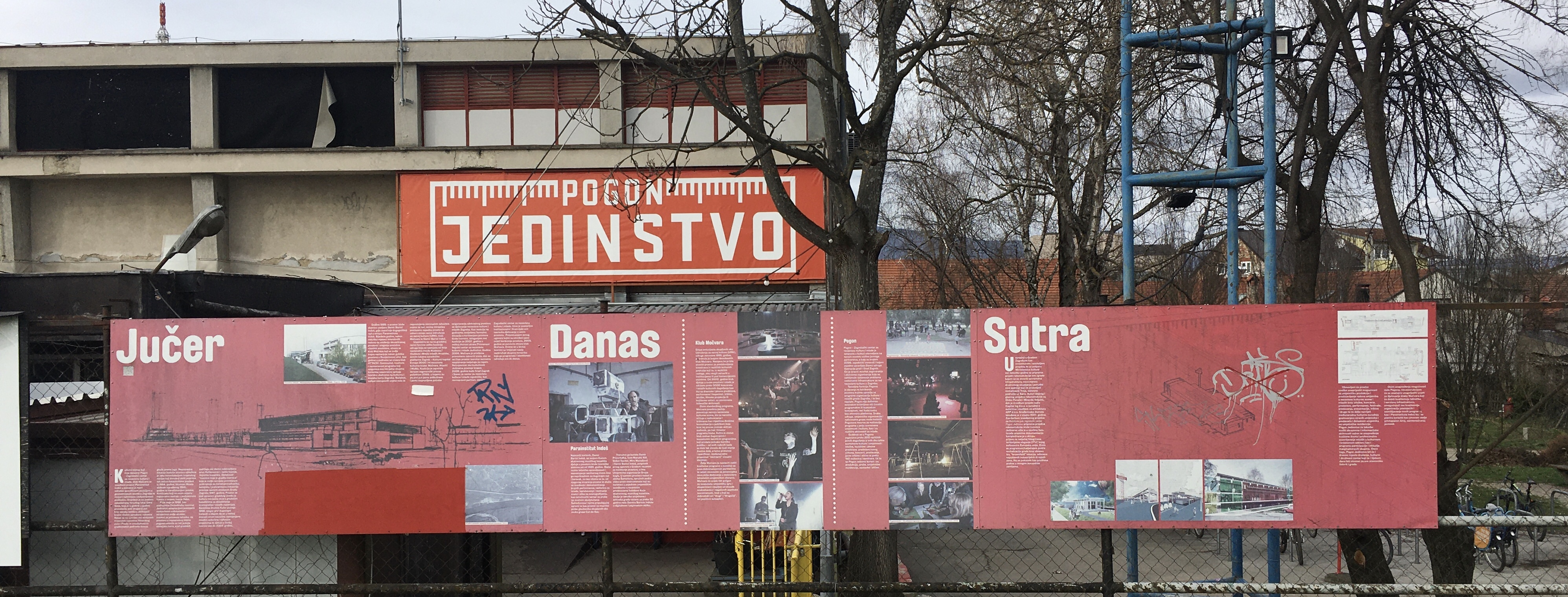
Jedinstvo hall / POGON with timeline panels made in 2024.

POGON, the Zagreb Center for Independent Culture and Youth, was founded in 2008. Pogon emerged as a result of advocacy and activism by independent cultural organizations. Pogon operates in cooperation with the City of Zagreb as a public civil partnership between the Alliance of Associations Operation City and the City of Zagreb as co-founders.

=== Histrionski dom Cultural Center (Centar za kulturu Histrionski dom) ===
The Histrionski dom Cultural Center was founded in 2016 by the City of Zagreb and the Histrion Acting Company. The programs are aimed at strengthening the theater offer in the area of the City of Zagreb. The theater performances are realized in their own or collaborative productions. The multi-purpose hall is modernly equipped, with a possible seating capacity of 300. In addition to the large hall, there is also a small cabaret stage called Gumbek, with 110 seats.

=== August Cesarac Center for Culture and Film (Centar za kulturu i film Augusta Cesarca) ===
The center's activities are focused on organizing film, music, art, theater and other cultural and artistic programs, as well as creative and ecology workshops. Since 2016, the Center has expanded its film screening activities to the Tuškanac Summer Stage, and since 2017, it has been a user of the Kinoteka cinema.

=== Center for Promoting Tolerance and Preservation of Holocaust Remembrance ===
The Center for Promoting Tolerance and Preservation of Holocaust Remembrance was established in 2017 (based on the public-civic partnership model) with the aim of promoting special programs aimed at promoting tolerance and a more humane society. The center was founded at the initiative of Branko Lustig, a two-time Oscar winner, and Nataša Popović, director of the Tolerance Festival – JFF. The center is jointly managed by the festival and the City of Zagreb.

=== New Cultural Spaces - Center for Cultural and Social Development (Novi prostori kulture - centar za kulturno-društveni razvoj) ===
This new city institution was founded in 2023 as a space for participatory, decentralized and diverse creation in the field of culture. The center works with artists and civil society organizations that develop and create innovative cultural and artistic programs to underserved parts of Zagreb.
