= Maksimir =

City district of Zagreb, Croatia

Coordinates: 45°49′55.76″N 16°1′11.49″E

- District of Zagreb
- Maksimir as a part of Zagreb
- Country: Croatia
- County/City: Zagreb

Government
  - Council President: Stanko Gačić (HDZ-DP-HSU-HSS)
  - District Council: Composition (15): M!-SDP (7); HDZ-DP-HSU-HSS (3); Marija Selak Raspudić list (2); Davor Bernardić list (1); Pavle Kalinić-ZDS list (1); Only Croatia-DOMiNO-HS-Blok (1)

Area
  - Total: 14.973 km^{2} (5.781 sq mi)

Population (2021)
  - Total: 47,356
  - Density: 3,162.8/km^{2} (8,191.5/sq mi)

Maksimir district Maksimir local council

Maksimir (pronounced [mǎksimiːr]) is one of the districts of Zagreb, Croatia, population 48,902 (2011 census). Maksimir stadium and Maksimir Park are located in it. It was named for Bishop Maksimilijan Vrhovac.

The urban center of the Maksimir district is located around the Maksimirska street, which is an area of dense commercial and residential usage. It spans from the Kvaternik Square, located on the southwestern border of the district, to the intersection of Maksimirska, Bukovačka and Svetice streets, which leads to the entrances to both the Maksimir park and the Maksimir stadium. The southeastern part of the district is a lowland that includes the Maksimir stadium and a large residential area best known as Ravnice (lit. "plains").

A substantial area in the east of the district is part of the Maksimir Park, one of the biggest parks in Zagreb. It also contains the Zagreb Zoo, which is the second-largest in Croatia; and five lakes, called the Maksimir lakes.

The central part of the district is mostly residential, with the notable exception of the large campus of the University Hospital Centre Zagreb.

The northern parts of the district are hilly, residential areas, with no high-rise buildings.

The district is bordered by Gornji Grad - Medveščak to the east, Donji grad to the southeast, Pešćenica to the south, Dubrava to the west, and Podsljeme to the north.

== Administrative division ==
Maksimir is subdivided into 11 sections (mjesni odbor):

- Bukovac
- "Dinko Šimunović"
- Dobri dol
- Dotrščina
- "Eugen Kvaternik"
- Kozjak
- Maksimir
- Maksimirska naselja
- Mašićeva
- Remete
- Ružmarinka

The area of the local city council of Maksimir is located in the central part of the district and has a population of 3,782 (census 2021), while also encompassing most of the forested park.

== Bibliography ==
=== Biology ===
- Šašić, Martina; Nahirnić, Ana; Tarmann, Gerhard M. (2016-12-31). "Zygaenidae (Lepidoptera) in the Lepidoptera collections of the Croatian Natural History Museum". Natura Croatica: Periodicum Musei Historiae Naturalis Croatici. 25 (2): 233–248. doi:10.20302/NC.2016.25.19. eISSN 1848-7386.
