= Kozjak, Zagreb =

Neighbourhood of Zagreb, Croatia

Kozjak
- Interactive map of Kozjak
- Coordinates: 45°50′06″N 15°59′47″E

Kozjak is a neighbourhood in the northeast of Zagreb, Croatia, within the Maksimir district. The area of the local city council of Kozjak has a population of 4,052 (census 2021).

The area was integrated into the city of Zagreb in the 20th century.

The City Theatre Žar ptica is located in the neighbourhood, near Mirogoj.
