= Tituš Brezovački =

Croatian playwright, satirist and poet

- Born: 4 January 1757; Zagreb, Kingdom of Croatia, Habsburg monarchy
- Died: 29 October 1805 (aged 48); Zagreb, Kingdom of Croatia, Austrian Empire
- Occupations: Poet, playwright, writer, priest
- Writing career
- Notable works: Matijaš Grabancijaš dijak; Diogeneš
- Literary movement: Enlightenment

Tituš Brezovački (January 4, 1757 – October 29, 1805) was a Croatian playwright, satirist and poet.

He wrote all of his dramatic works in Kajkavian dialect. His poems were chiefly written in Latin, but few of them have also been preserved in Ikavian Štokavian.

== Biography ==
He was born in Zagreb, schooled in Zagreb and Varaždin, and in 1774 he entered the Pauline Order. He initiated the study of theology in 1776 in Lepoglava, and afterwards graduated philosophy and theology in Pest. He was ordained in 1781, serving as a gymnasium professor in Varaždin henceforth. In 1785 the Pauline Order was abolished, causing Brezovački to become a common priest. His disputes with clergy and the bishop Maksimilijan Vrhovac had often forced him to relocate, changing parishes (Varaždin, Križevci, Rakovac, Zagreb, Krapina, Požega, Zagreb).

He wrote his first known work, the religious drama Sveti Aleksi for the gymnasium in Varaždin, where it was staged before being printed in Zagreb in 1786. In Križevci he wrote the Latin poem Dalmatiae, Croatiae et Slavoniae trium sororum recursus ad novum Proregem Ioannem Erdődy, ne suis priventur coronis et novo sponso Leopoldo ab Hungaria (The plea of three sisters, Dalmatia, Croatia and Slavonia to the new Ban, count János Erdődy, (Note: Erdődy's given name is sometimes given as Ivan, in line with the Croatian variant of the name John (Latin: Iohannes).) that they might not be robbed of their crowns and of their new bridegroom, Leopold, by Hungary), published in 1790, which represented a strong political shift in his work. This was followed by a similar poem Ode inclytae nobilitati regnorum Dalmatiae, Croatiae, Sclavoniae (Ode to the illustrious nobility of the kingdoms of Dalmatia, Croatia, and Slavonia), printed in 1800, to encourage resistance against Napoleon. During this period, he was a vocal critic of the higher clergy in Zagreb, which he criticized in the poem Jeremijaš nad horvatskoga orsaga zrušenjem narekujuči by the end of the 18th century, ending its censorship in 1801. He dedicated another poem to the newly constructed foundation hospital located on today's Ban Jelačić Square in 1804.

Between 1803 and 1805, he wrote his most known works; a comedy about a sorcerer Matijaš Grabancijaš dijak (first staged in 1804) and Diogeneš.

He died in Zagreb on October 29, 1805, exhausted by a lung disease.

== Works ==
=== Drama ===
- Sveti Aleksi, religious drama (1786)
- Matijaš Grabancijaš dijak, comedy (1804)
- Diogeneš ili sluga dveh zaljubljenih bratov, comedy (1805)

=== Poetry ===
- Dalmatiae, Croatiae et Slavoniae trium sororum recursus ad novum Proregem Ioannem Erdődy, ne suis priventur coronis et novo sponso Leopoldo ab Hungaria (1790)
- Ode inclytae nobilitati regnorum Dalmatiae, Croatiae, Sclavoniae (1800)
- Jeremijaš nad hrvatskoga orsaga zrušenjem nerekujuči (1801)

== Sources ==
- Fališevac, Dunja; Nemec, Krešimir; Novaković, Darko (2000), Leksikon hrvatskih pisaca (in Croatian), Zagreb: Školska knjiga d.d, ISBN 953-0-61107-2
- "Brezovački, Tito (Tituš)". Croatian Encyclopedia (in Croatian).
