= Maksimir Park =

Urban protected area in Zagreb

Coordinates: 45°49′47″N 16°01′14″E

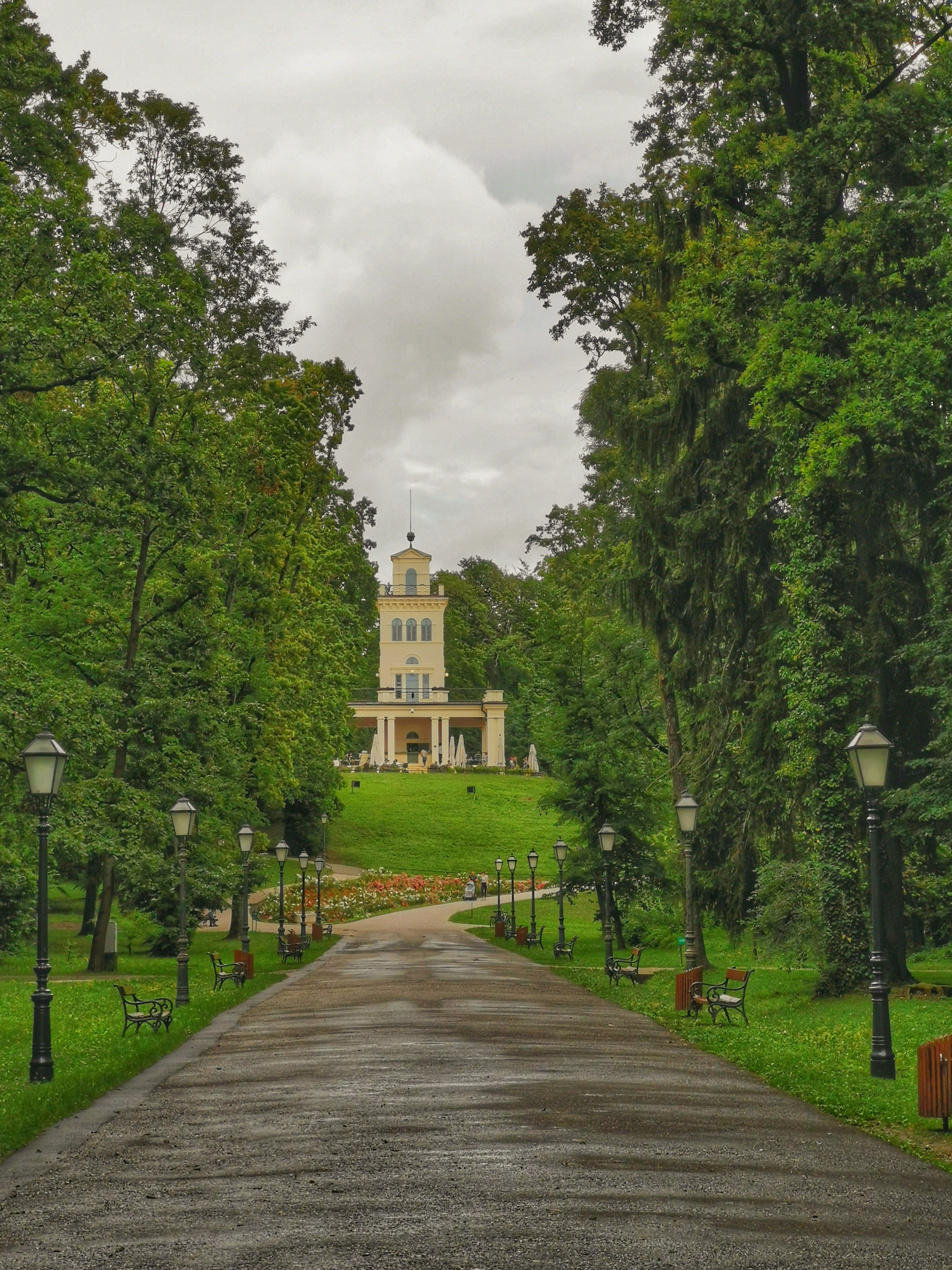
- Maksimir Park main trail
- Interactive map of Maksimir Park
- Type: Public park
- Location: Maksimir, Zagreb, Croatia
- Area: 316 hectares (780 acres) 3.15 km^{2}
- Created: 1787; 239 years ago
- Founder: Maksimilijan Vrhovac
- Operator: City of Zagreb
- Visitors: 2,5 million (2023)
- Website: www.park-maksimir.hr

Cultural Good of Croatia
- Type: Protected cultural good
- Reference no.: Z-1528

Maksimir Park is a 316-hectares (780-acres), historic public park in Maksimir, Zagreb. Often called Hyde Park or Central Park of Zagreb, it is the oldest and largest of the parks and green spaces founded by Bishop Maksimilijan Vrhovac, which was named after him. Situated in the eastern part of the city, it spans approximately 316 hectares of landscaped grounds, woodlands, meadows, and five artificial lakes. The park is widely regarded as a prime example of early 19th-century landscape design influenced by English Romanticism. The park is a home to Zagreb Zoo and it's register under Cultural Goods of Croatia.

Alongside Hyde Park, Nicolae Romanescu Park, El Retiro park, Parc des Buttes-Chaumont and Villa Borghese it is considered one of the best parks in Europe.

== History ==
Park Maksimir was established on the southern slopes of Medvednica in the late 18th and early 19th centuries, through the clearing of native forests of hornbeams (Carpinus betulus) and oaks (Quercus robur and Q. petraea). Founded in 1787 and opened to the public in 1794, the park was initiated by Maksimilijan Vrhovac (1752–1827), the Bishop of Zagreb, after whom it is named. It represents the first large public park in southeastern Europe and is among the earliest public parks in the world, predating most similar developments across Europe. At the time of its establishment, it was situated on the outskirts of the city; however, subsequent urban expansion has resulted in the surrounding neighbourhoods largely encompassing it. At the time of its creation, Maksimir was considered one of the most significant achievements of park design within the Austro-Hungarian Monarchy. Until then, landscaped parks were predominantly private spaces associated with aristocratic estates and royal residences, and were not accessible to the general public. Remnants of the original forest have been preserved as a surrounding belt, and the park today covers an area of more than 1,005 acres (4.07 km^{2}).

Park Maksimir was established on the southern slopes of Medvednica in the late 18th and early 19th centuries, through the clearing of native forests of pedunculate oak and common hornbeam. It represents the first public park in southeastern Europe, ranks among the earliest public parks in the World, and predates the majority of Europe's public park foundings. At the time of its creation, it was considered one of the most significant achievements of park design within the Austro-Hungarian Monarchy. Prior to this period, landscaped parks were predominantly private spaces, inaccessible to the public, and typically associated with aristocratic estates and royal residences.

Zagreb Zoo opened its doors on June 27, 1925, at the initiative of engineer Mijo Filipović, and with the support of the then mayor of Zagreb, architect Vjekoslav Heinzel. The Zoological Garden (the name remained until 1927) and today's zoo has grown to include 383 species of animals and over 7,000 individuals. When it began, it was the first in Southeast Europe, and today it is the largest zoo in Croatia.

== Landscaping ==
Maksimir Park plan from 1846, following Juraj Hauliks development

Maksimir Park current park plan (2021)

The landscaping was first conceived by Bishop Vrhovac in the baroque style. As one of the earliest public parks, it followed the principles laid out by the gardening theorist Christian Cay Lorenz Hirschfeld. Following the death of Maksimilijan Vrhovac, work on the development of Park Maksimir was continued by Bishop Aleksandar Alagović (1760–1837). He abandoned the original Baroque concept of the park and initiated efforts to open up the landscape, including the formation of meadows and the thinning of woodland areas to create a more spacious environment. Although Alagović carried out relatively few physical interventions, he laid the foundations for the development of a landscape-style park. This vision was ultimately brought to completion by Archbishop Juraj Haulik (1788–1869), who is regarded as the principal creator and designer of Maksimir Park. In 1839, Bishop Juraj Haulik, and others redesigned the park. Haulik's vision was very much in line with Biedermeierist notions, and romantic neoclassicism, with elements from historicism; and in emulation of the park at the Laxenburg estate of the Habsburgs.

The process of transforming Maksimir Park involved the felling of the forest interior, the grading of hills, the excavating of great holes for lakes, the laying of paths, and construction of bridges.

Others who were instrumental in the making of the park were sculptors Anton Dominik Fernkorn (1813–1878), and Josip Kassmann (1784–1856); master gardener Franjo Serafin Korbler (1812–1866); landscape architect Michael Sebastian Riedel (1763–1850); and architect Franz Schücht.

During this period, numerous park structures were designed and constructed, many of them by Schücht. These included pavilions and ornamental buildings such as Bellevue Pavilion, the Gloriette, the Echo Pavilion (built in 1840 and the only preserved pavilion in the park), as well as various rustic structures including the Fisherman’s Cottage, the Swiss House (1842), the Gatekeeper’s Lodge (1847), a lookout pavilion (Kiosk, built in 1843), and an inn (constructed around 1860, today known as the Maksimilijan restaurant). Several earlier pavilions, such as the Umbrella Pavilion and the People’s Temple, have not survived.

== Design ==
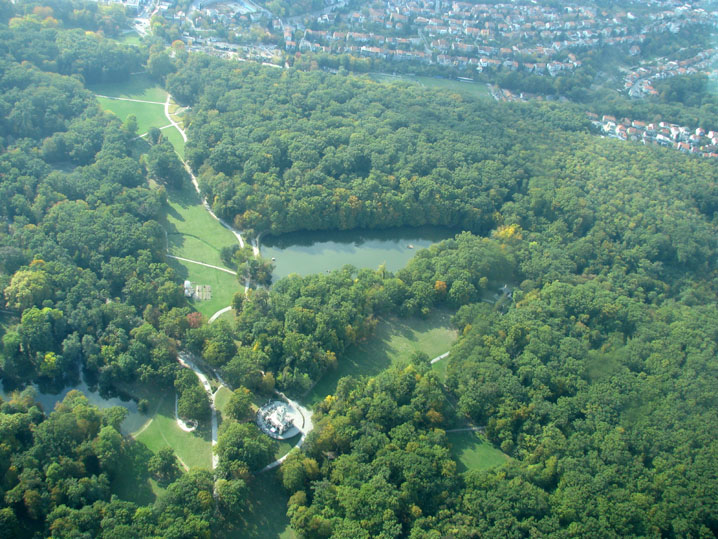
Aerial view of the park

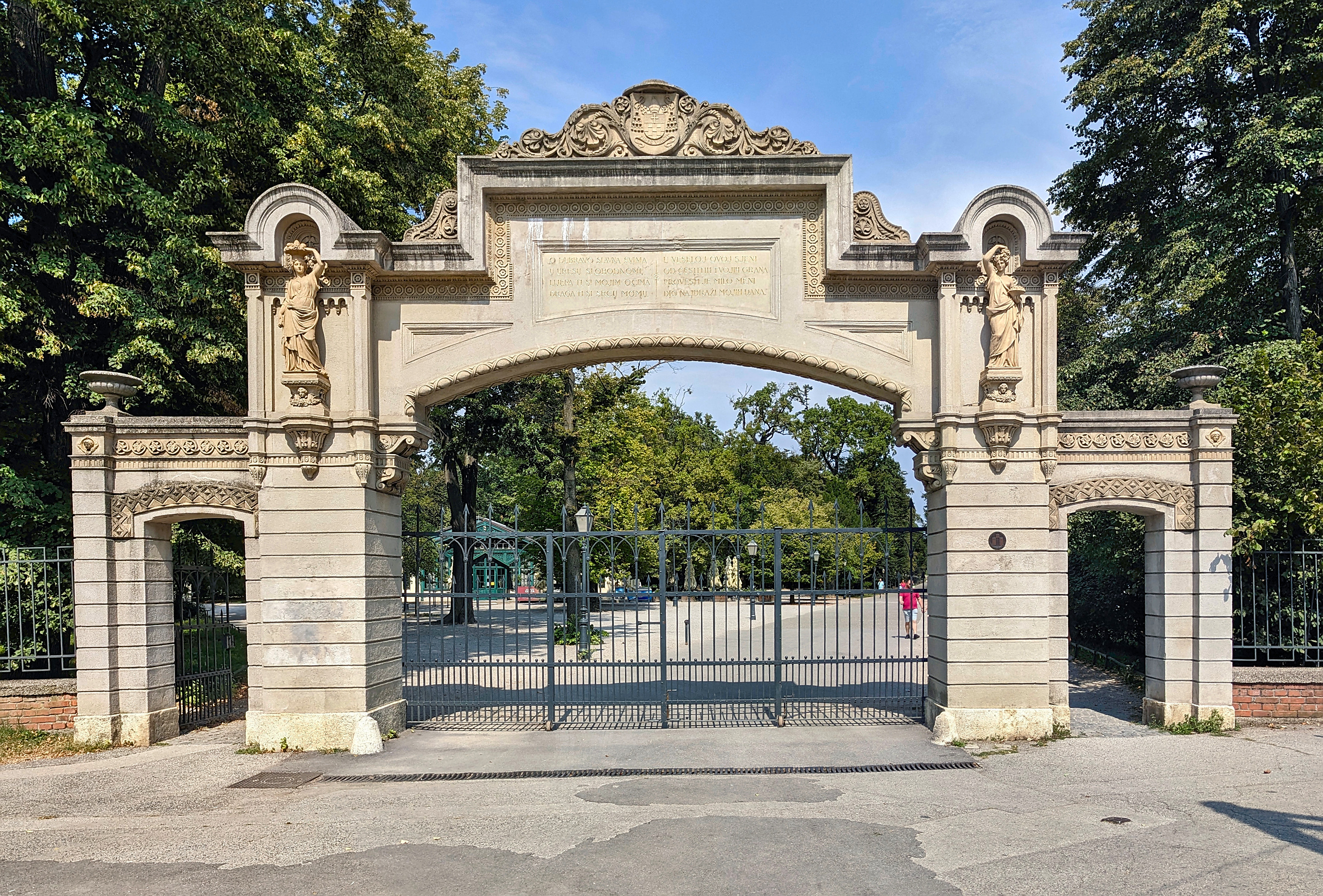
Main entrance to the park

The park has several big meadows, numerous creeks, and five lakes, and is a habitat for various plant and animal species, such as the Middle Spotted Woodpecker (Dendrocopos medius), an endangered species in Europe. Zagreb’s Zoo also forms part of the park’s territory, located in the southern part of Maksimir Park. In addition to the park, the name Maksimir may also refer to one of Zagreb’s neighborhoods and NK Dinamo’s stadium, both of which are adjacent to the park.

The park has 10 entrances, the main one being on south-east from Maksimir Road. The original main entrance (portal) to Park Maksimir was constructed in 1841. It consisted of two large square pylons between which a carriage entrance was set, flanked by two smaller pillars that marked pedestrian entrances. The larger pylons were crowned with substantial stone vases, while smaller vases adorned the lesser pillars. The pedestrian entrances were fitted with single-leaf gates, and the carriage entrance with a double-leaf folding gate. All gates were made of wrought iron with spear-shaped finials. In its overall form, the entrance represented a Classicist architectural composition.

In 1867, a new portal was erected in which Classical elements were reinterpreted with Neo-Gothic forms. This structure comprised four four pillars-like pillars connected by a massive lintel, surmounted by an attic (a stepped parapet wall) framed with forked ornamentation. At its centre stood the inscription “Jurjevac.” The larger pylons were decorated with sculptures of two deities from Roman mythology: Flora, the goddess of flowers, and Pomona, the goddess of fruit and trees. This portal was severely damaged in the 1880 Zagreb earthquake, when its arched lintel collapsed. Following the earthquake, the portal was reconstructed in a simplified form, lacking the original arched superstructure.

=== Cultural heritage ===
There are a number of statues and memorials around Maksimir Park. The most notable monument is a Lookout seen from the entrance on little hill. The obelisk-shaped monument (Obelisk), a work by the sculptor Joseph Käschmann, was erected in 1843 in Park Maksimir on the initiative of Archbishop Juraj Haulik. It was placed in the so-called Dahlia Valley in commemoration of the completion of major works on the park. The monument is composed of a stepped base with a square plinth supporting a pyramidal obelisk. Three large bronze laurel wreaths are affixed to the rear and the lateral sides of the plinth, while four smaller bronze wreaths are mounted on each face of the pyramidal section. On the front side of the square base is a metal plaque bearing a Latin inscription in which Haulik expressed his intentions and motivations for the creation and development of Maksimir Park.

One of the symbols of Park Maksimir is the Mogila, a commemorative mound constructed in 1925 to mark the 1,000th anniversary of the Croatian Kingdom. Designed by architect Aleksandar Freudenreich, it was erected by the Croatian Sokol Union in honour of the Third All-Sokol Rally held in Zagreb from 14 to 16 August 1925. Completed in 1926, Mogila is crowned by a stone and was originally intended to support a bronze statue of a falcon by sculptor Ivo Kerdić, which was later destroyed. The monument was restored in 1994, and in 1995 a new falcon sculpture, designed by Father Marijan Gajšak and completed by sculptor Mladen Mikulin, was installed. The site was further enriched with a symbolic addition of Croatian soil blessed by Pope John Paul II in 1994.

Other monuments in the parks are; Pavilion of Echos, Gothic chapel of St. George, Swiss House, Summer House, Lions Bridge, Egyptians statues, Neapolitan Fisherman statue and others.

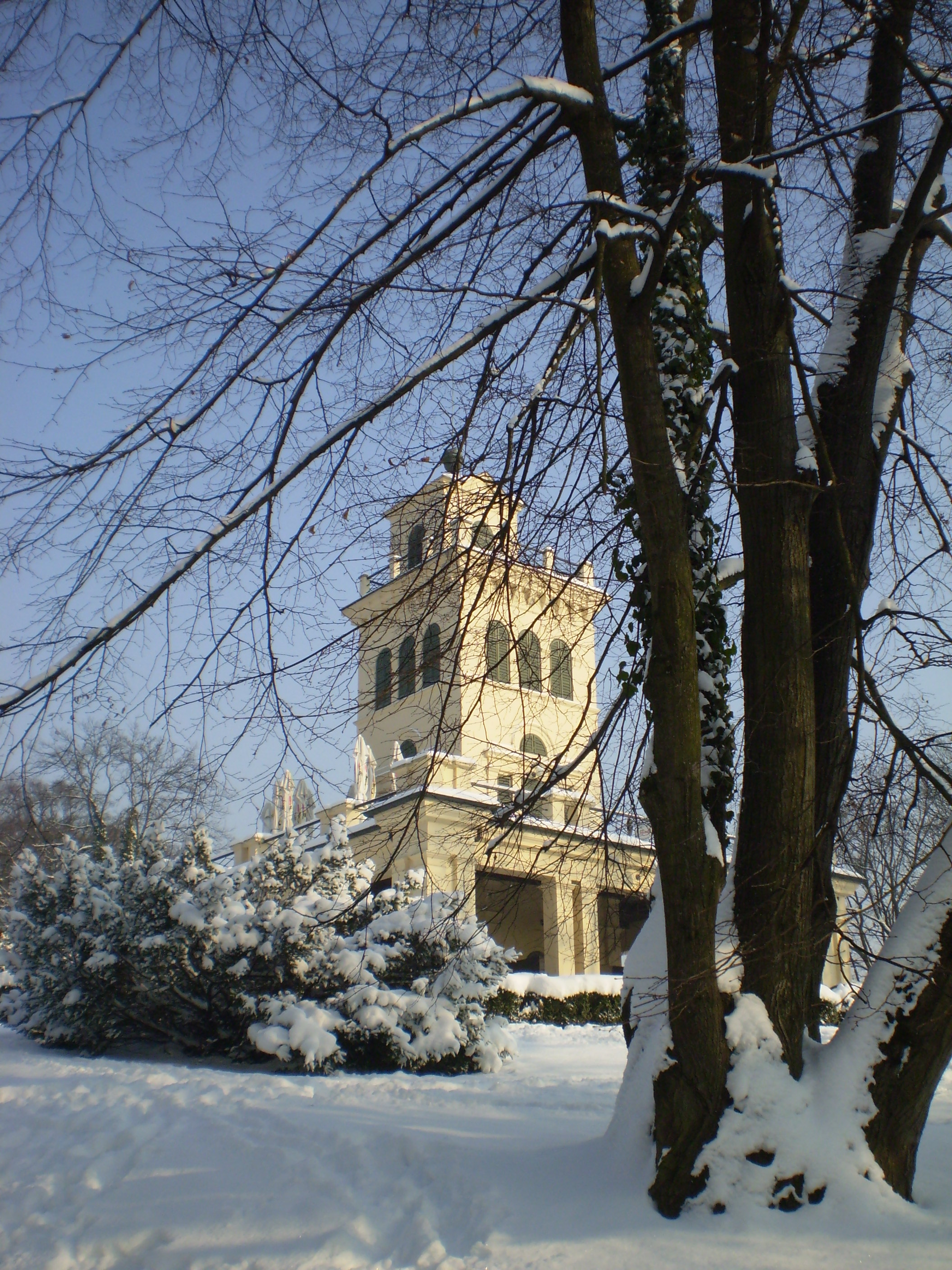
Lookout

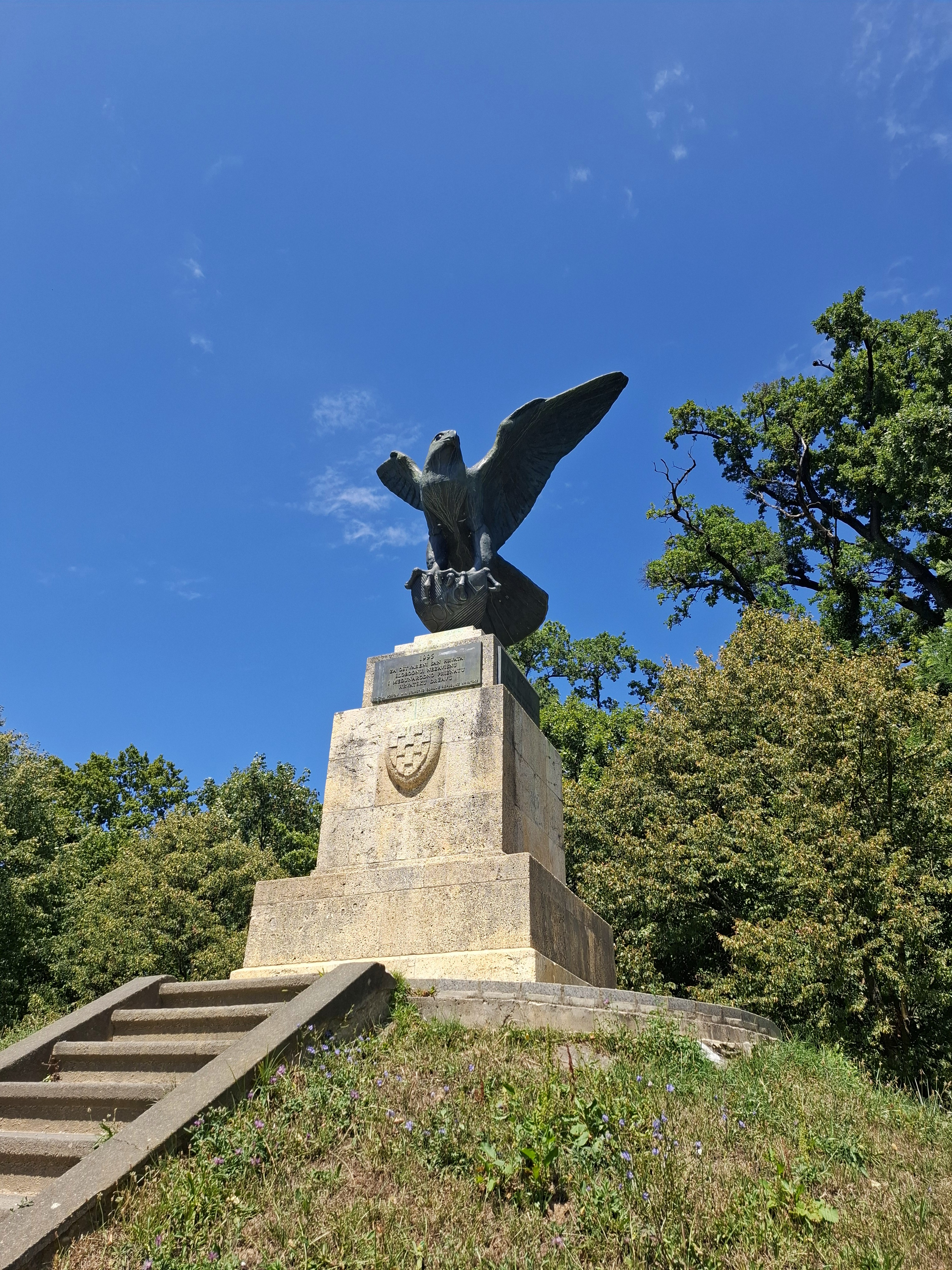
Mogila monument

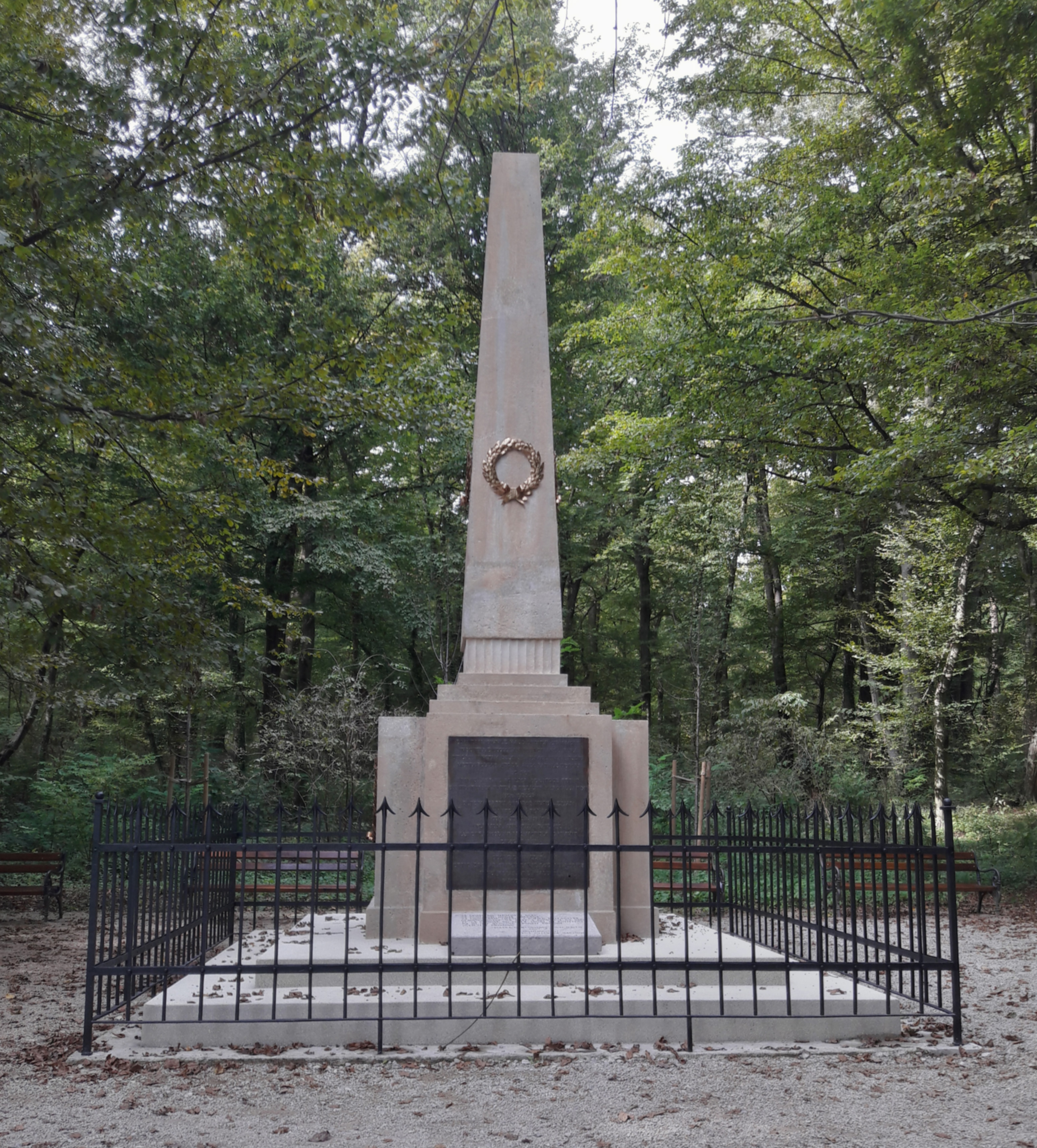
Obelisk

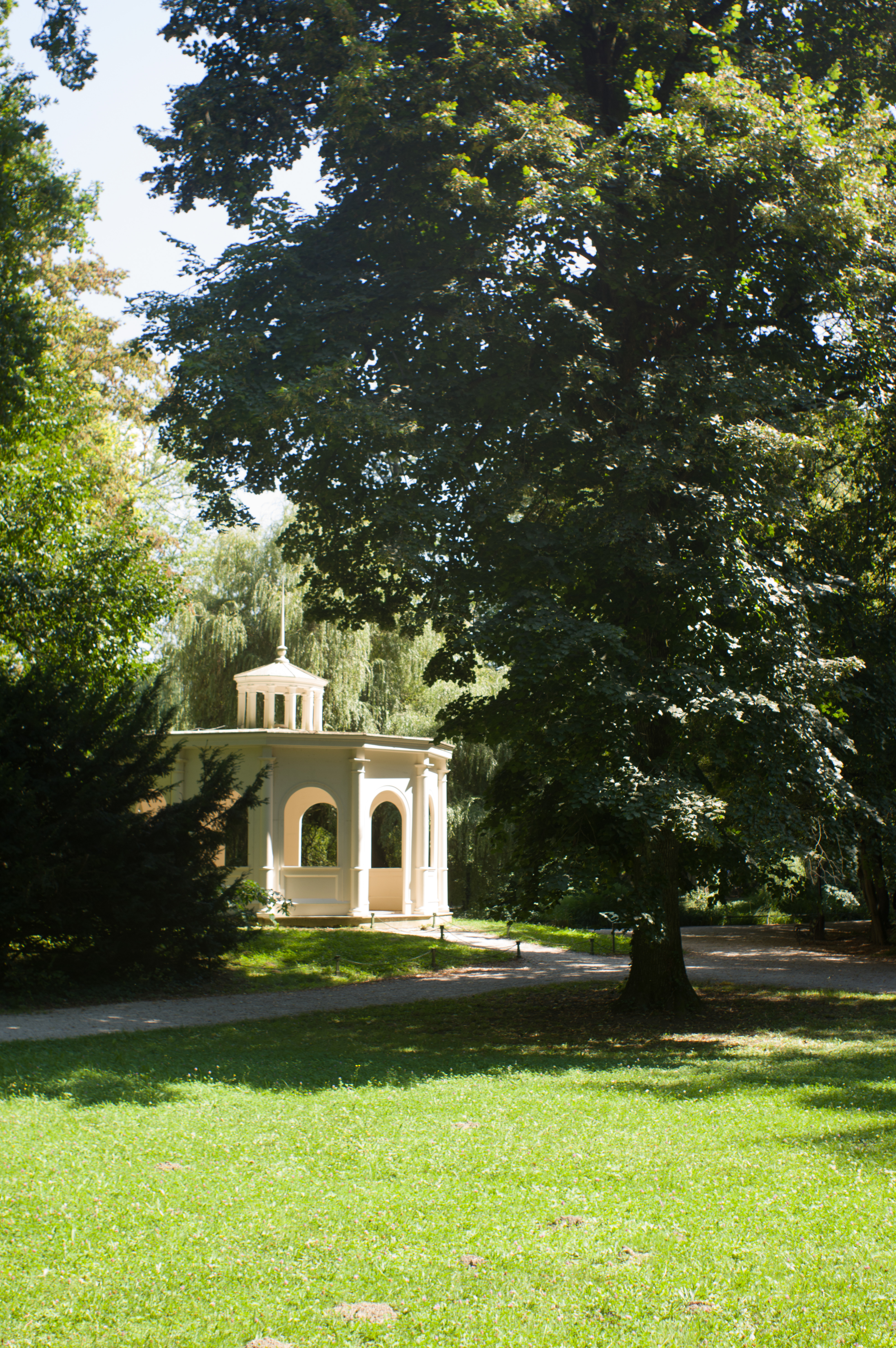
Pavilion of Echos

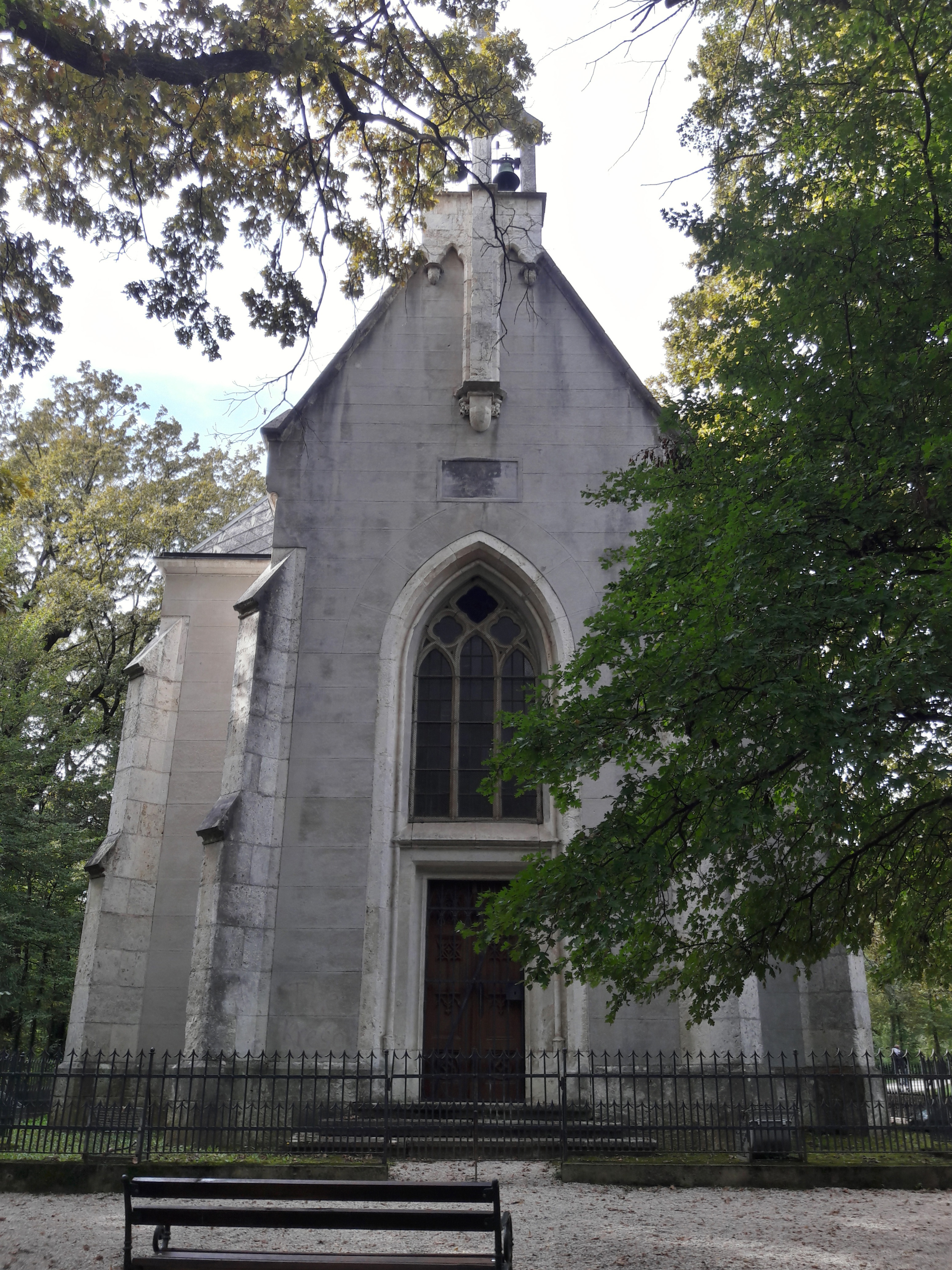
Gothic chapel of St. George

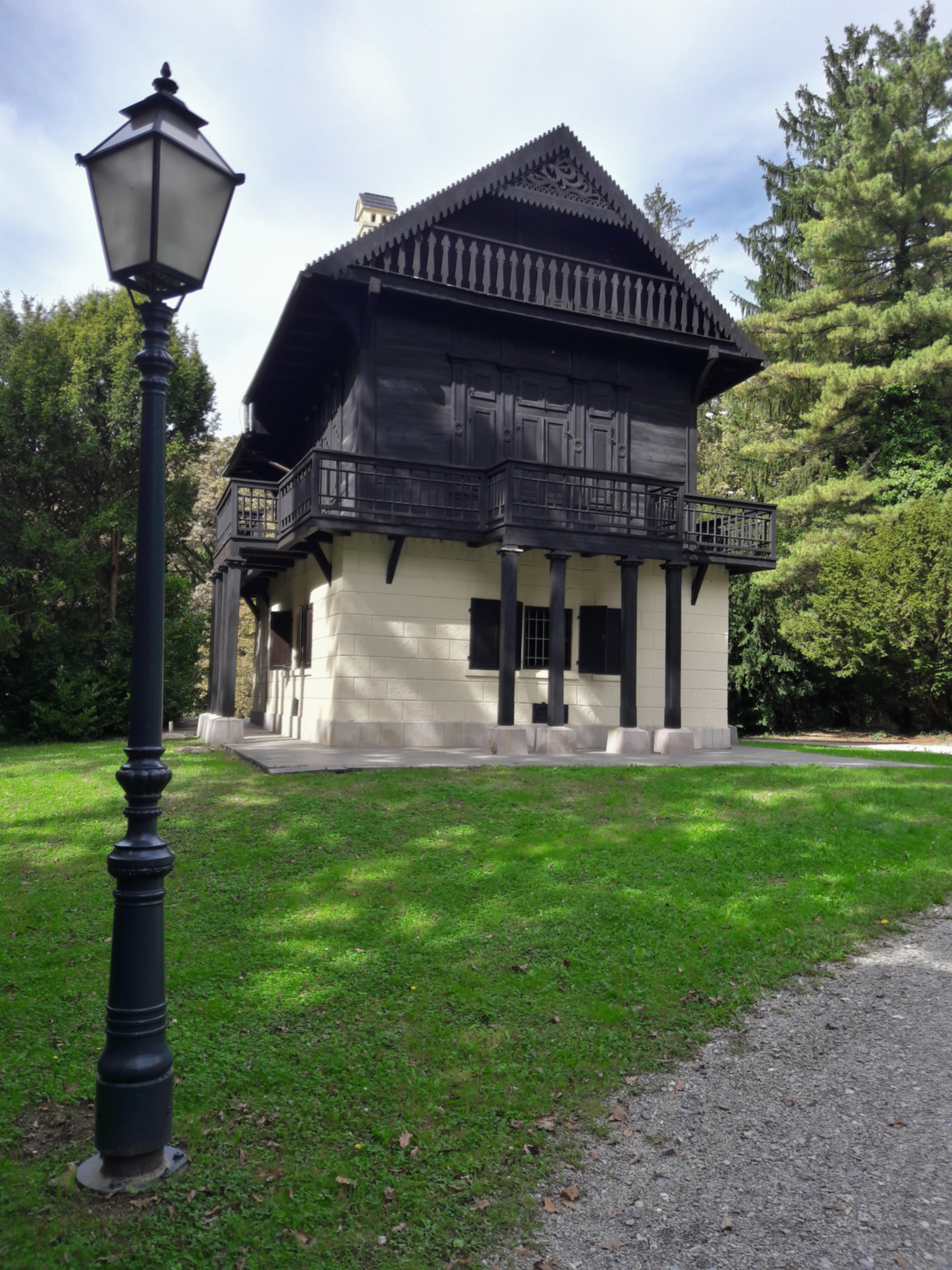
Swiss house

=== Lakes ===
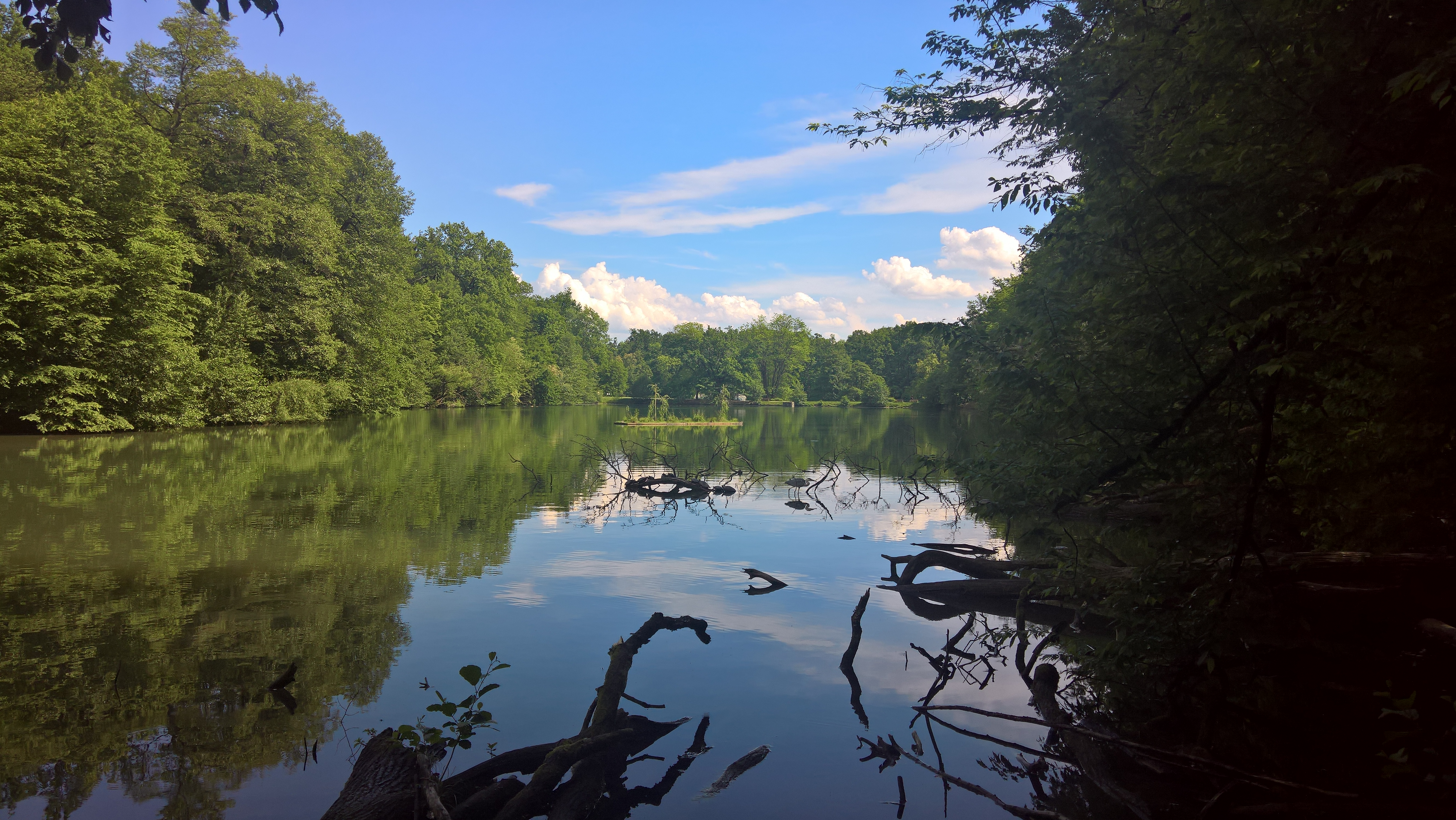
Third Lake

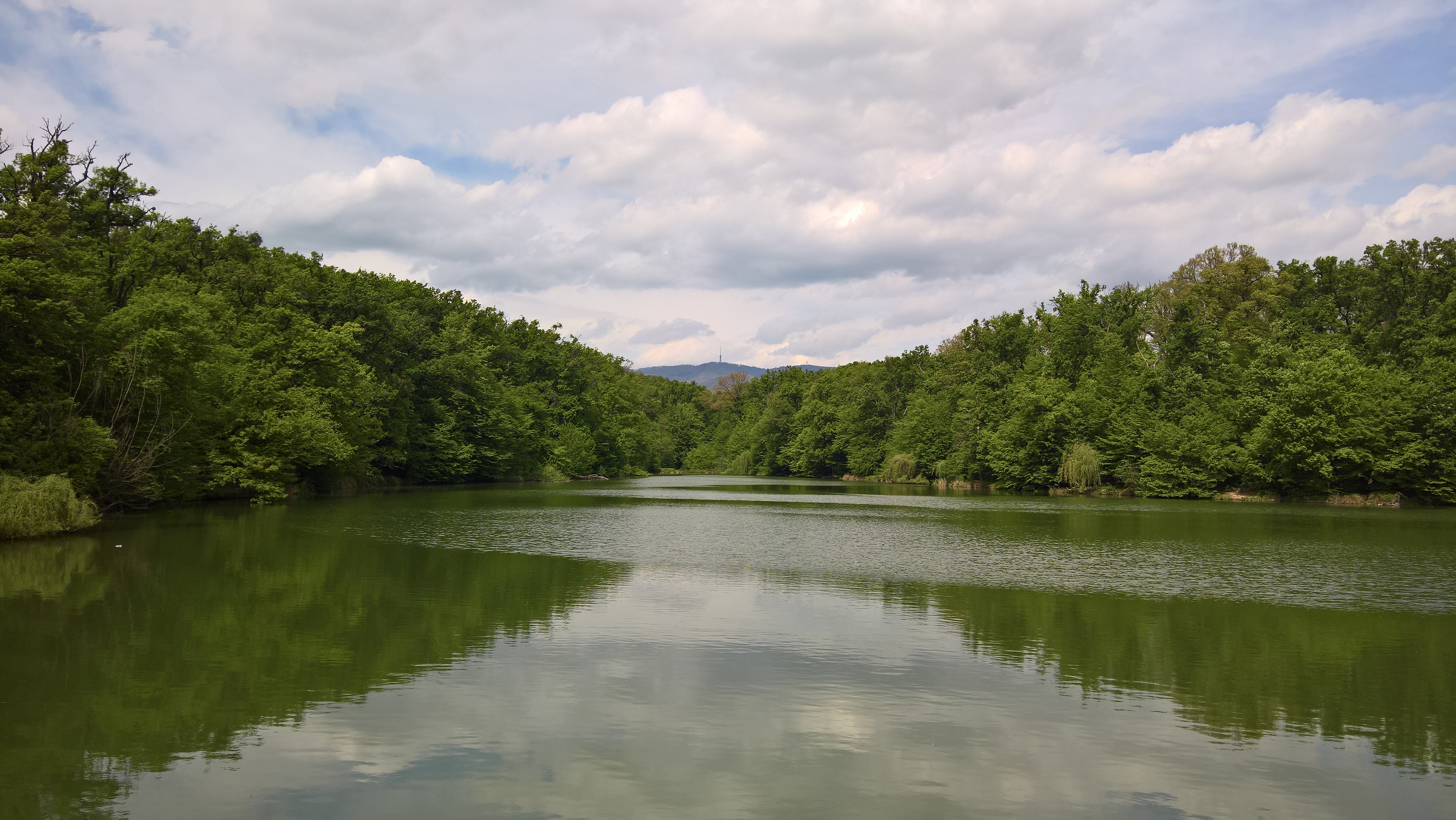
Fifth Lake

Maksimir Park Lakes are an integral part of the landscape design of Park Maksimir, formed alongside the park’s development and originally serving both ornamental and functional purposes as fishponds and later as recreational boating areas.

The system originally comprised six lakes, of which five remain today (First to Fifth Lake), while the Sixth Lake (Ribnjak) has disappeared. The lakes were gradually constructed from 1839 onward and are mainly fed by the Bliznec Stream, with minor seasonal input from smaller streams such as Dahlia and Mirni Dol.

The First Lake, the largest and historically most developed, was expanded under Bishop Juraj Haulik in the mid-19th century and includes artificial islands. The Second Lake functions as a sedimentation basin and connector within the system, while the Third, Fourth, and Fifth Lakes form the northern cascade, with the Fifth being the largest and still used for recreation and fishing.

The former Sixth Lake (Ribnjak) served as a fish-breeding pond but no longer exists, though traces of its bed remain visible. Overall, the lakes are maintained through a regulated hydrological system dominated by Bliznec Stream, with additional minor tributary inputs.

== Flora and Fauna ==
=== Fauna ===
The fauna of Park Maksimir is closely connected to its vegetation and represents an important component of the park’s ecosystem, although historical records are relatively scarce. The earliest documented observations date to the mid-19th century, including references to white storks and occasional sightings of wolves in the wider area, with the last wolf near Zagreb recorded in 1890. Historically, the park also served for various forms of animal husbandry, including beekeeping, silkworm breeding, and small enclosures for deer, pheasants and medicinal leeches.

Today, despite its urban surroundings, Maksimir remains an important habitat for diverse wildlife, although urbanisation has led to the disappearance of larger mammals such as deer and wolves. Mammals still present include squirrels, dormice, bats, foxes, and martens.

The bird community is particularly rich, with over 100 recorded species and around 70 confirmed or occasional breeders. Forest bird species dominate, especially cavity-nesters such as woodpeckers, nuthatches, and tits. The park is also notable for hosting high densities of the middle spotted woodpecker (Dendrocopos medius), a species considered threatened at the European level. Waterfowl, especially the mallard (Anas platyrhynchos), are common on the lakes.

Amphibians and reptiles are also present, including common toads, salamanders, brown frogs, pond frogs, and reptiles such as the introduced red-eared slider (Trachemys scripta elegans), European pond turtle (Emys orbicularis), and grass snake (Natrix natrix). The invertebrate fauna remains insufficiently studied, although dragonflies, butterflies, and various aquatic and terrestrial insects are frequently observed.

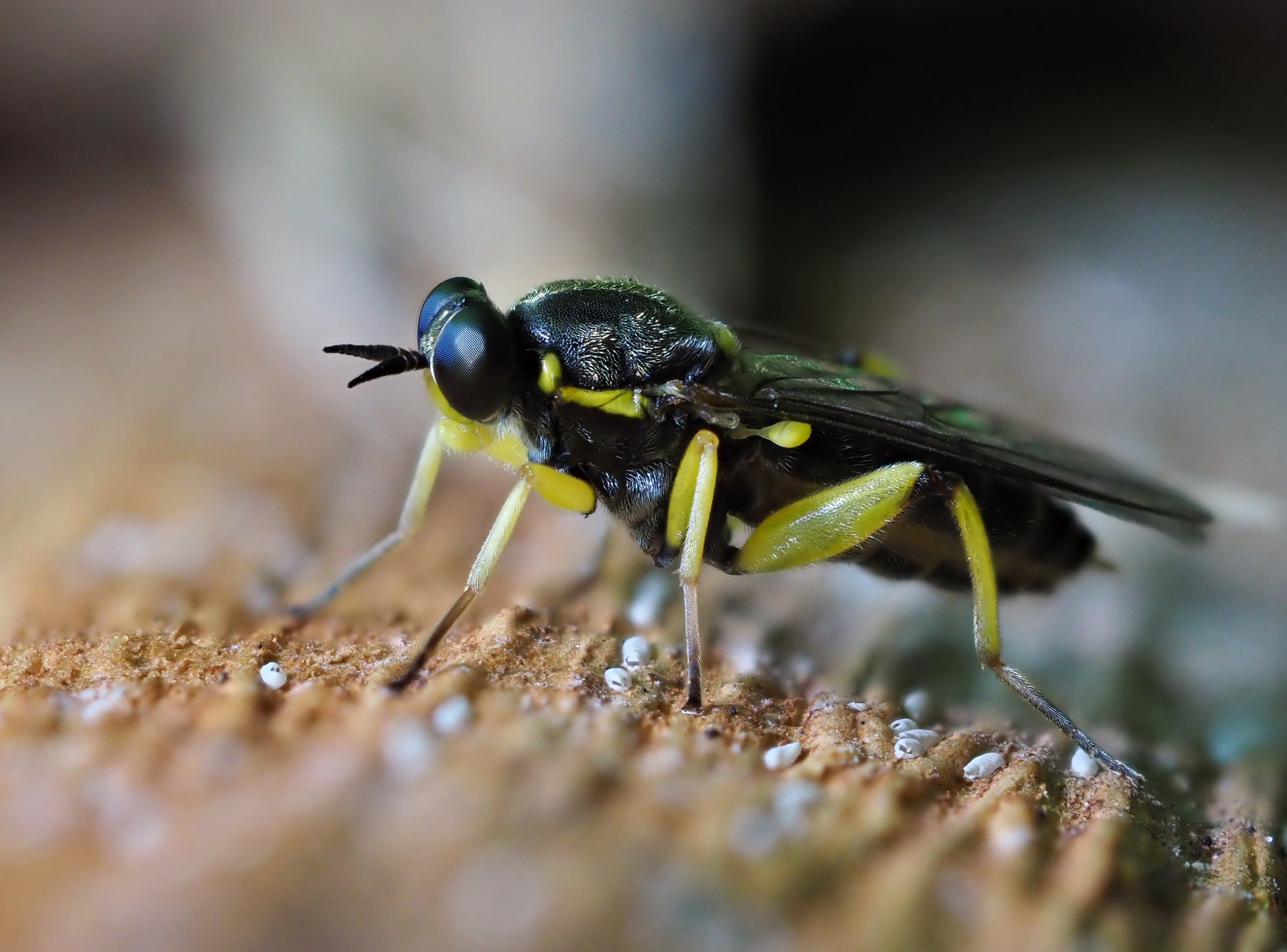
Solva marginata

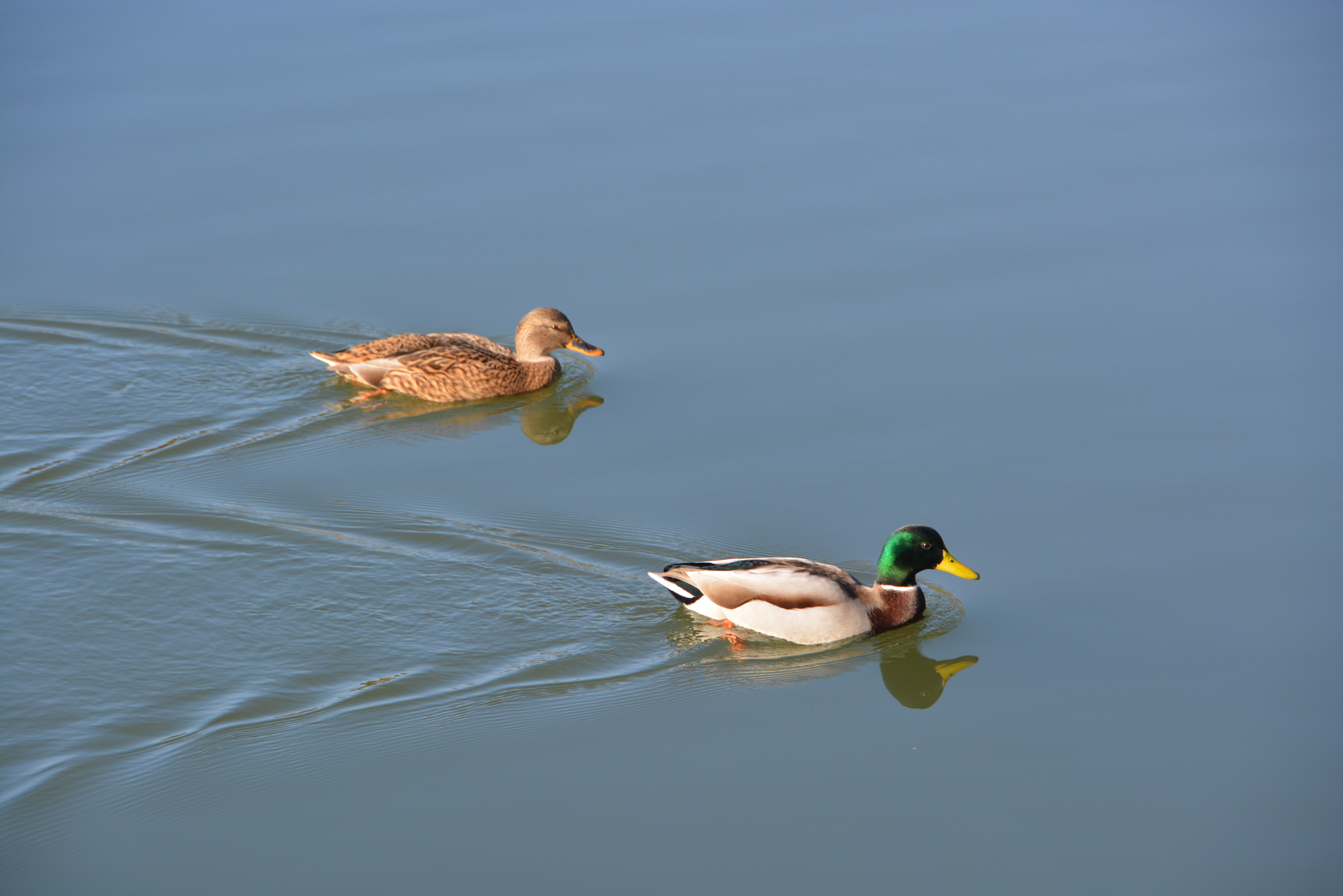
Anas platyrhynchos

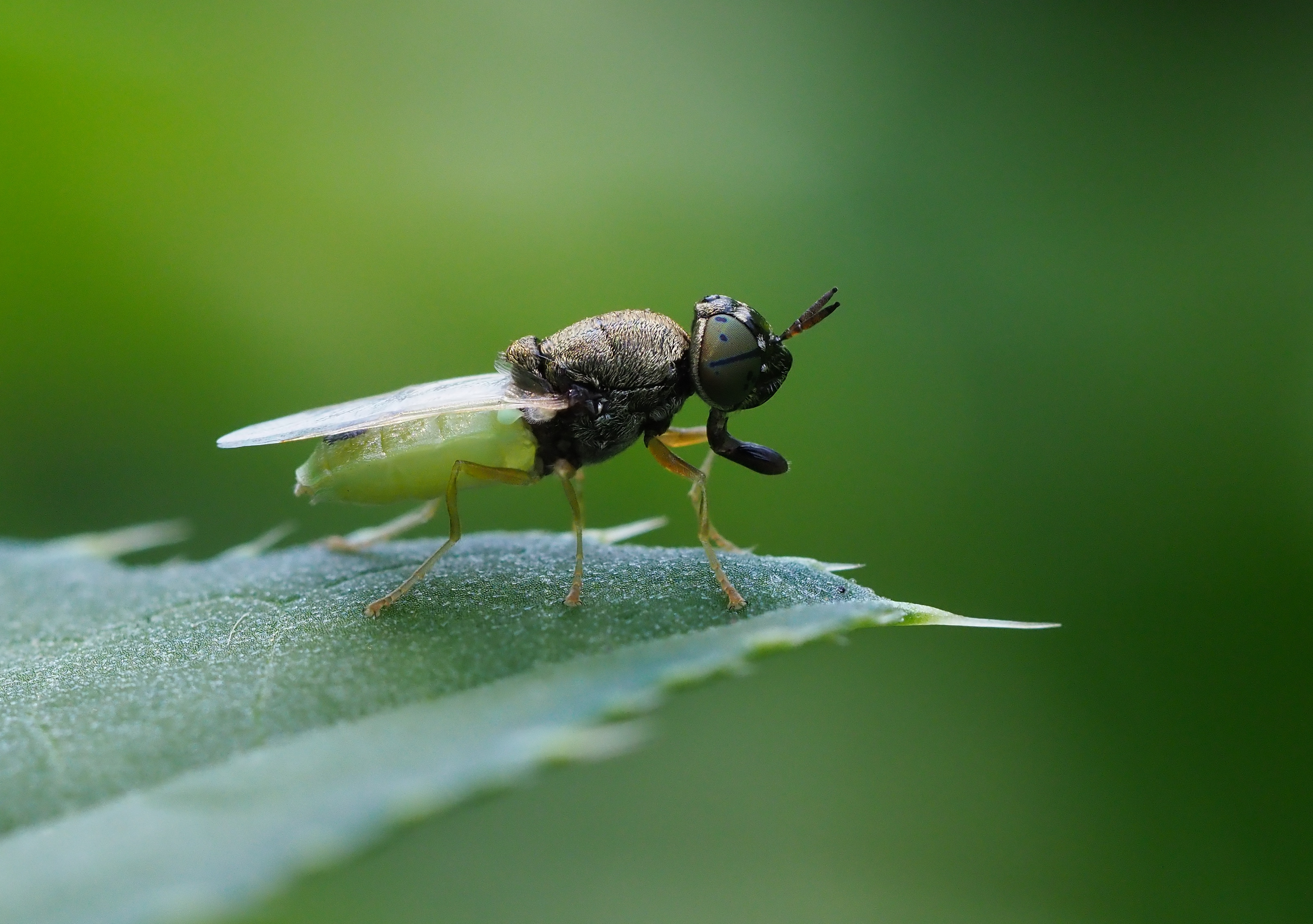
Oplodontha viridula

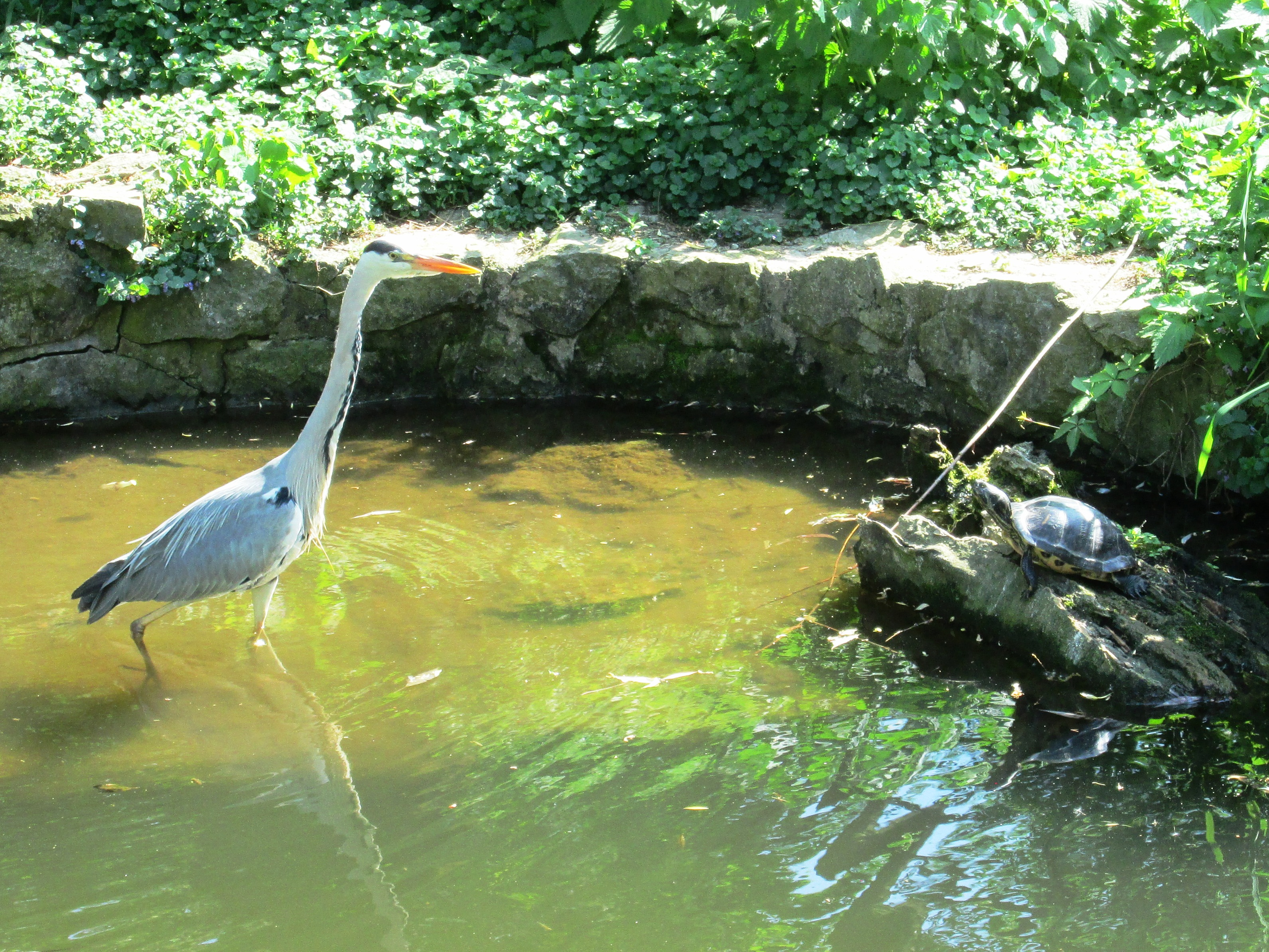
Grey Heron

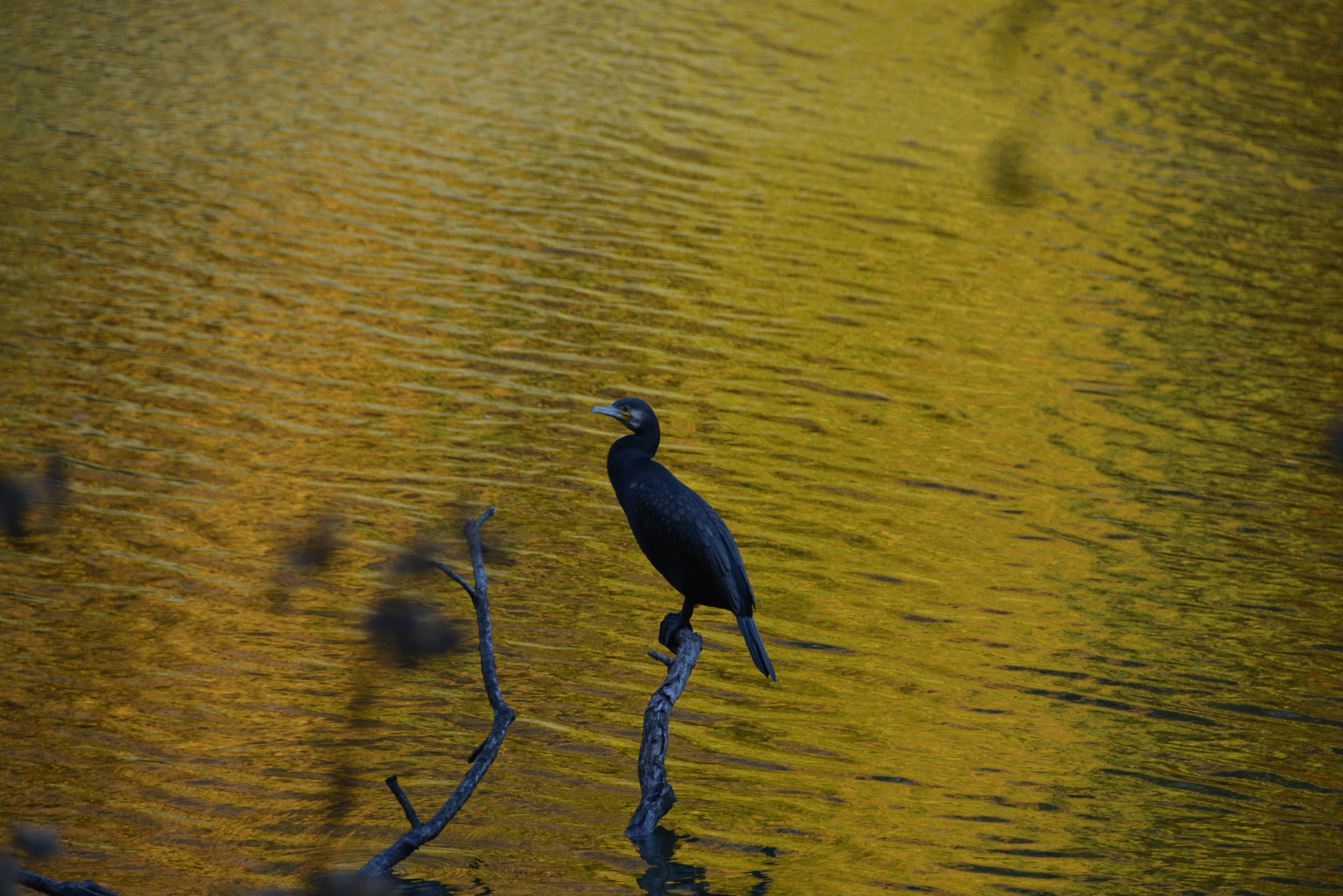
Grebe

=== Flora ===
Basidiomycetes include:

- Agaricus campestris
- Agaricus elevatus
- Agaricus fibrosolaceratus
- Amanita excelsa
- Amanita regalis
- Amanita rubescens
- Artomyces pyxidatus
- Boletus aereus
- Boletus purpurascens Rostk.
- Boletus strobilaceus
- Caloboletus radicans
- Cantharellus cibarius
- Calocybe gambosa
- Calymotta macrocystis Vouk et Pevalek
- Clavaria coriacea
- Clavulina coralloides
- Clitocybe hydrogramma
- Clitocybe infundibuliformis
- Collybiopsis peronata
- Coprinus comatus
- Cortinarius caperatus
- Entoloma politum
- Fomitopsis betulina
- Ganoderma lucidum
- Geastrum fimbriatum
- Gomphidius glutinosus
- Gymnopus androsaceus
- Gymnopus fusipes
- Handkea utriformis
- Hebeloma crustuliniforme
- Hebeloma fastibile
- Hericium cirrhatum
- Hygrocybe flammea
- Hypholoma fasciculare
- Inocybe fraudans
- Inocybe lacera
- Laccaria laccata
- Lactarius scrobiculatus
- Lactarius serifluus
- Lactarius torminosus
- Lactifluus piperatus
- Lactifluus volemus
- Lepista nuda
- Lycoperdon caudatum
- Lycoperdon decipiens
- Lycoperdon perlatum
- Marasmius achyropus (Pers.) Fr.
- Marasmius molyoides
- Marasmius rotula
- Mutinus caninus
- Mycena filopes
- Mycena inclinata
- Paxillus involutus
- Phallus impudicus
- Pleurotus ostreatus
- Polyporus alveolarius
- Pratella coruggis Pers.
- Pseudosperma rimosum
- Rickenella fibula
- Russula adusta
- Russula aeruginea
- Russula cyanoxantha
- Russula depallens
- Russula emetica
- Russula fragilis
- Russula ochroleuca
- Russula risigallina
- Russula sanguinaria
- Russula vesca
- Russula virescens
- Scleroderma bovista
- Suillus bovinus
- Suillus flavus
- Tricholoma lascivum
- Tricholoma luridum
- Tricholoma terreum
- Tylopilus felleus
- Volvariella volvacea
- Xerocomellus chrysenteron

== Climate ==
Since records began in 1949, the highest temperature recorded at the local weather station at an elevation of 123 metres (404 ft) was 40.4 °C (104.7 °F), on 5 July 1950. The coldest temperature was −31.4 °C (−24.5 °F), on 15 February 1940.

== Transport ==
There are six Zagreb tram lines located on south edge of Maksimir Park. A stop named Park Maksimir is located at the main entrance into the park.

- 4 (Dubec - Savski most)
- 5 (Dubrava - Ljubljanica)
- 7 (Dubrava - Savski most)
- 11 (Črnomerec - Dubec)
- 12 (Dubrava - Ljubljanica)
- 34 (Dubec - Ljubljanica)

ZET bus lines 228, 227, 226 and 203 frequently connect the park to the rest of the city. A less frequent bus route 226 from a nearby Svetice terminal connects to the Mirogoj cemetery and goes on to the Kaptol terminal in the old city centre.

== Gallery ==
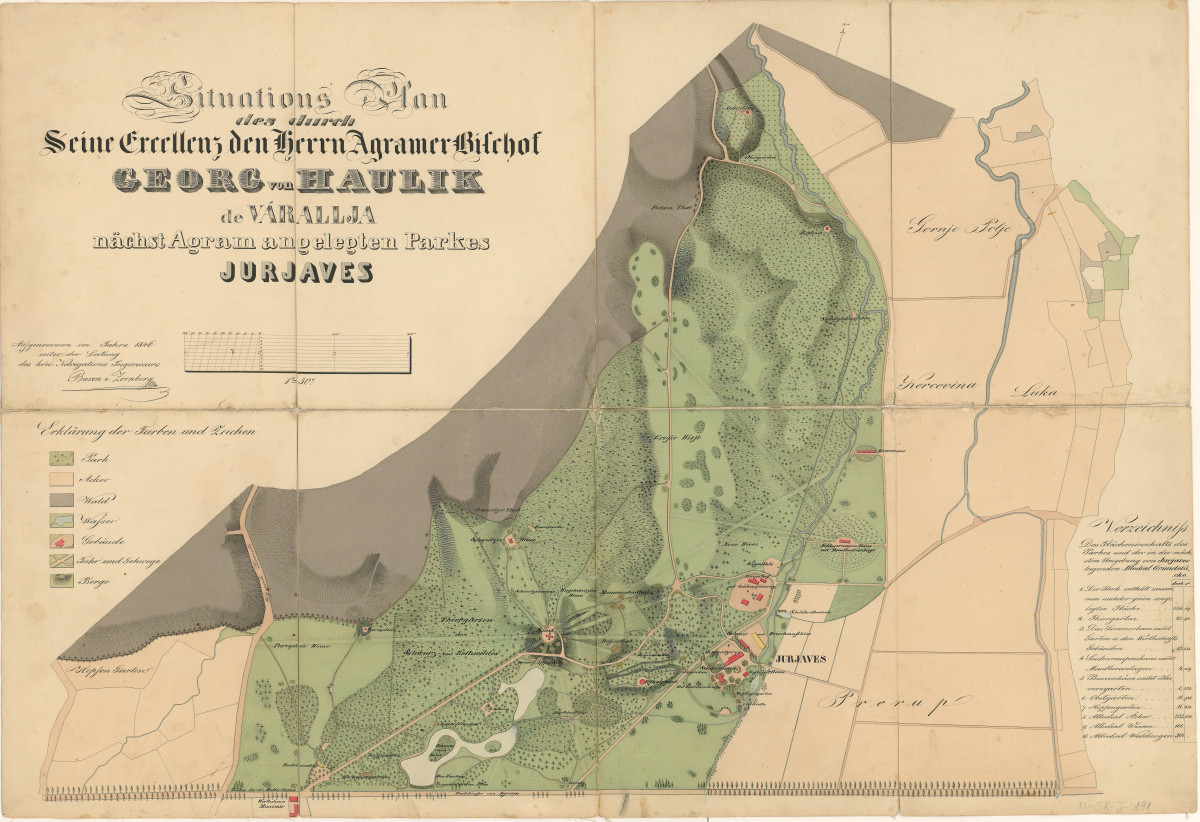
An 1846 map of the park

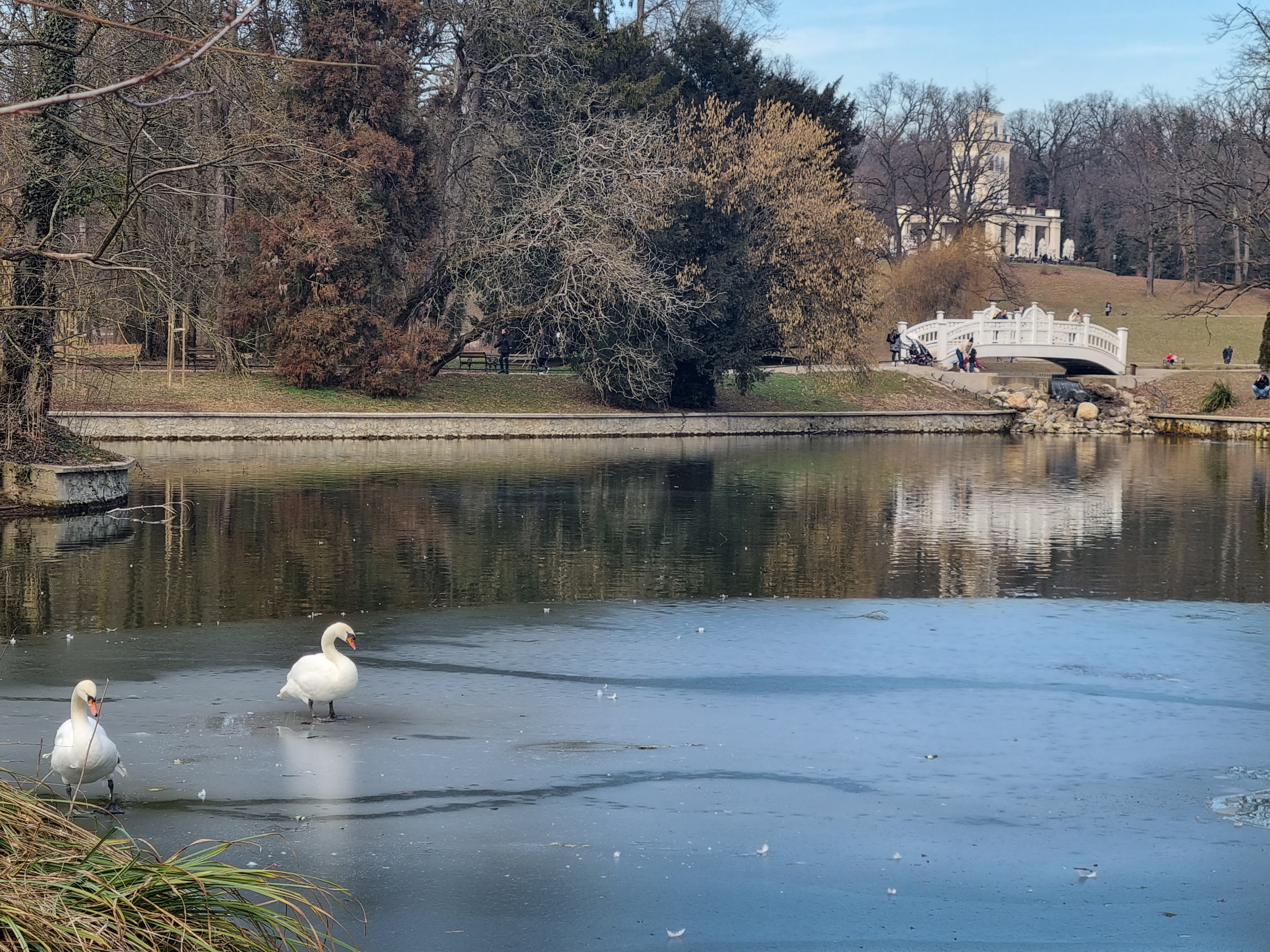
Maksimir First lake and wooden Lace Bridge

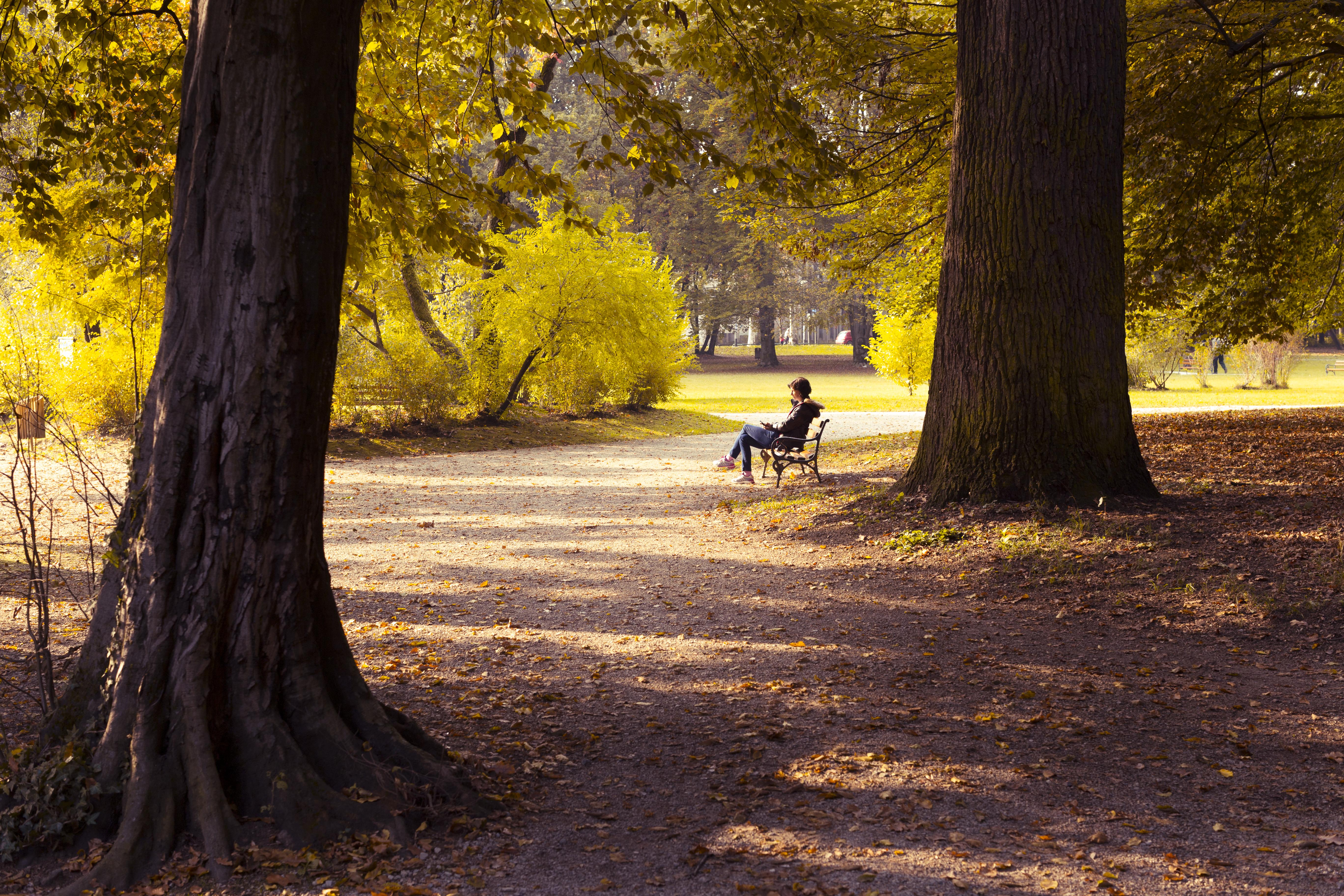
Maksimir Park in Autumn

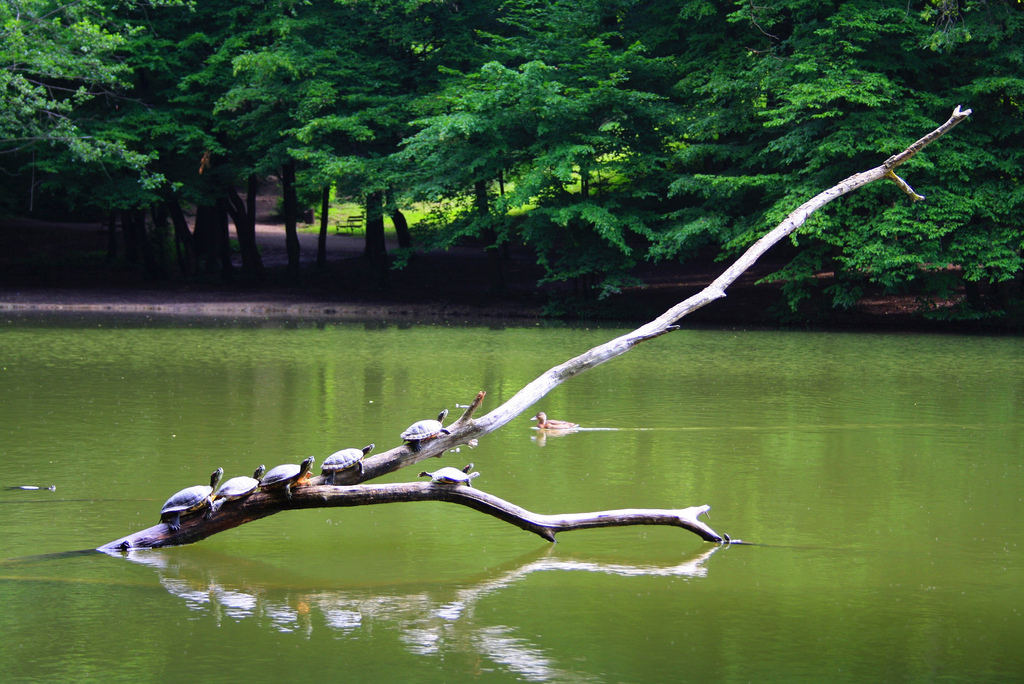
Turtles in the Maksimir lake

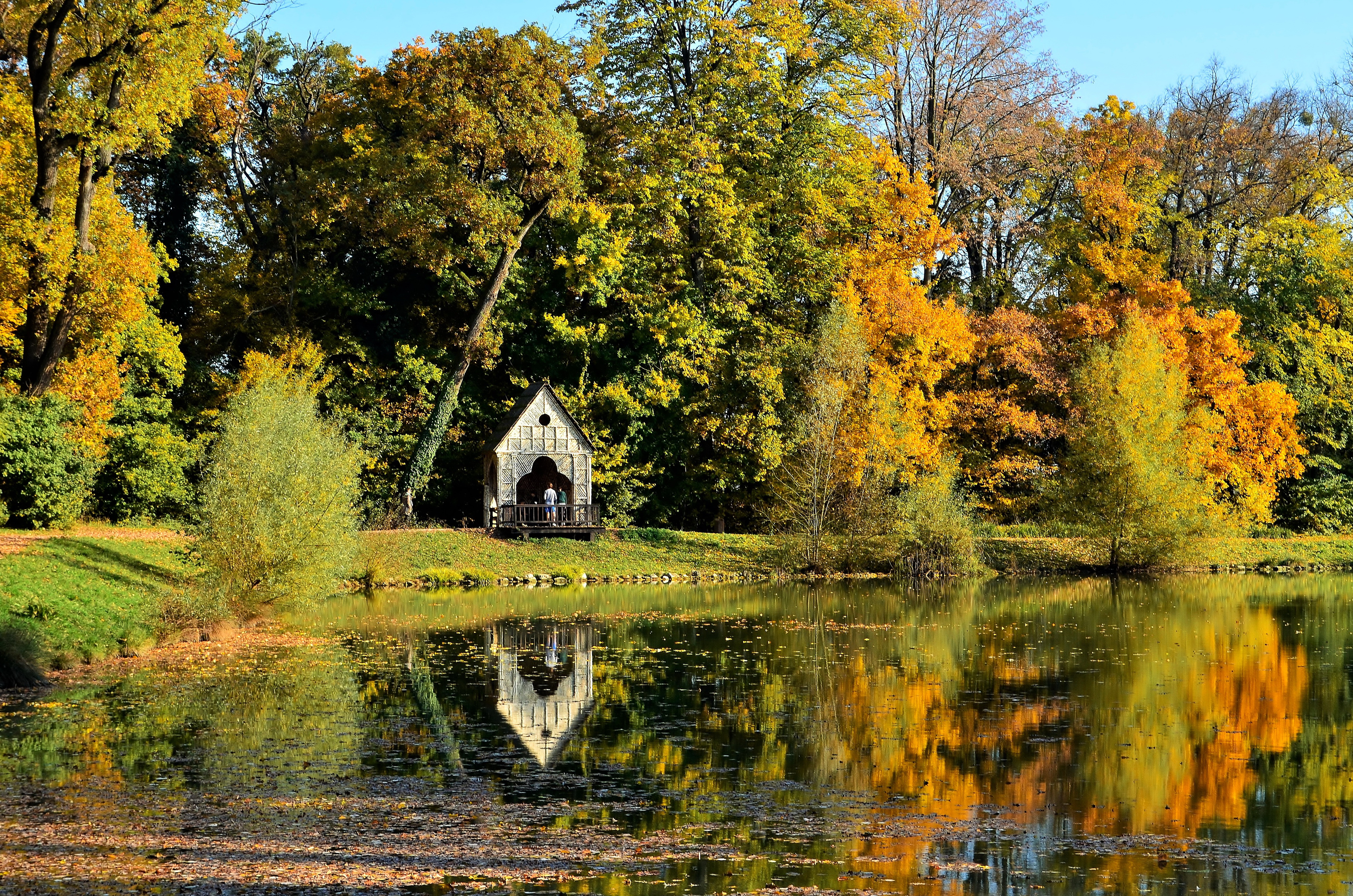
Fisherman's cottage on the Fourth Lake

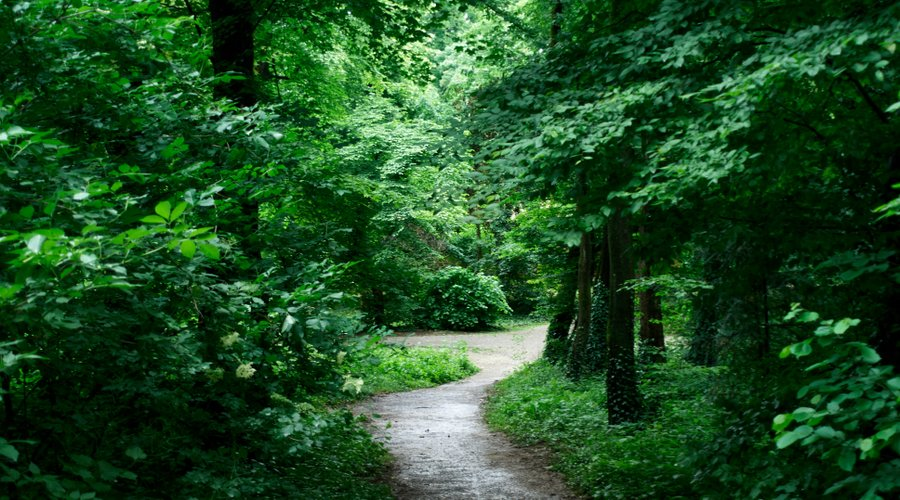
Path through the woods of Maksimir
