= Lašćina =

Neighbourhood of Zagreb, Croatia

Coordinates: 45°49′21″N 15°59′53″E

Dobri Dol local council "Dinko Šimunović" local council

Lašćina is a neighbourhood in the northeast of Zagreb, Croatia, within the Maksimir district.

Ljudevit Jonke wrote that the toponym comes from the word vlast, lit. 'power, authority' in 1956, but Valentin Putanec in 1983 argued it was more likely to be related to the words vlah, vlaški, lit. 'Vlach/Roman/Latin' because of the nearby Vlaška Street.

The area is administratively split between the local city councils of "Dinko Šimunović", which has a population of 3,623 (census 2021), and the local city council of Dobri Dol with a population of 4,259 (census 2021).

Lašćina was integrated into the city of Zagreb in the latter half of the 20th century. The council "Dinko Šimunović" was named in 2009, after the writer Dinko Šimunović.

The prominent streets of the area include the west-central Lašćinska cesta (lit. 'Lašćina Road'), stretching between Mirogoj in the north and Petrova ulica near Kvaternik Square in the south. The University Hospital Centre Zagreb Rebro campus is located in the Mijo Kišpatić street in the east. The Jordanovac street, stretching in a north-south direction extends into the local council Mašićeva near the XV Gymnasium.

The student housing Lašćina of the University of Zagreb, the Clinical Hospital Merkur, the Vuk Vrhovac University Clinic and the Children's hospital Srebrnjak are also located in the neighbourhood.
