= Remete, Zagreb =

Neighbourhood of Zagreb, Croatia

Coordinates: 45°50′51″N 15°59′36″E

Remete
- Interactive map of Remete

Remete is a neighbourhood in the northeast of Zagreb, Croatia, within the Maksimir district. The area of the local city council of Remete had a population of 5,923 in the 2021 census.

The old village of Remete has been known since the Middle Ages, especially for its Marian shrine, today known as the Shrine of the Assumption of Blessed Virgin Mary of Remete. At the time, it attracted even more pilgrims than the shrine in Marija Bistrica. Remete was integrated into the city of Zagreb in 1949.
