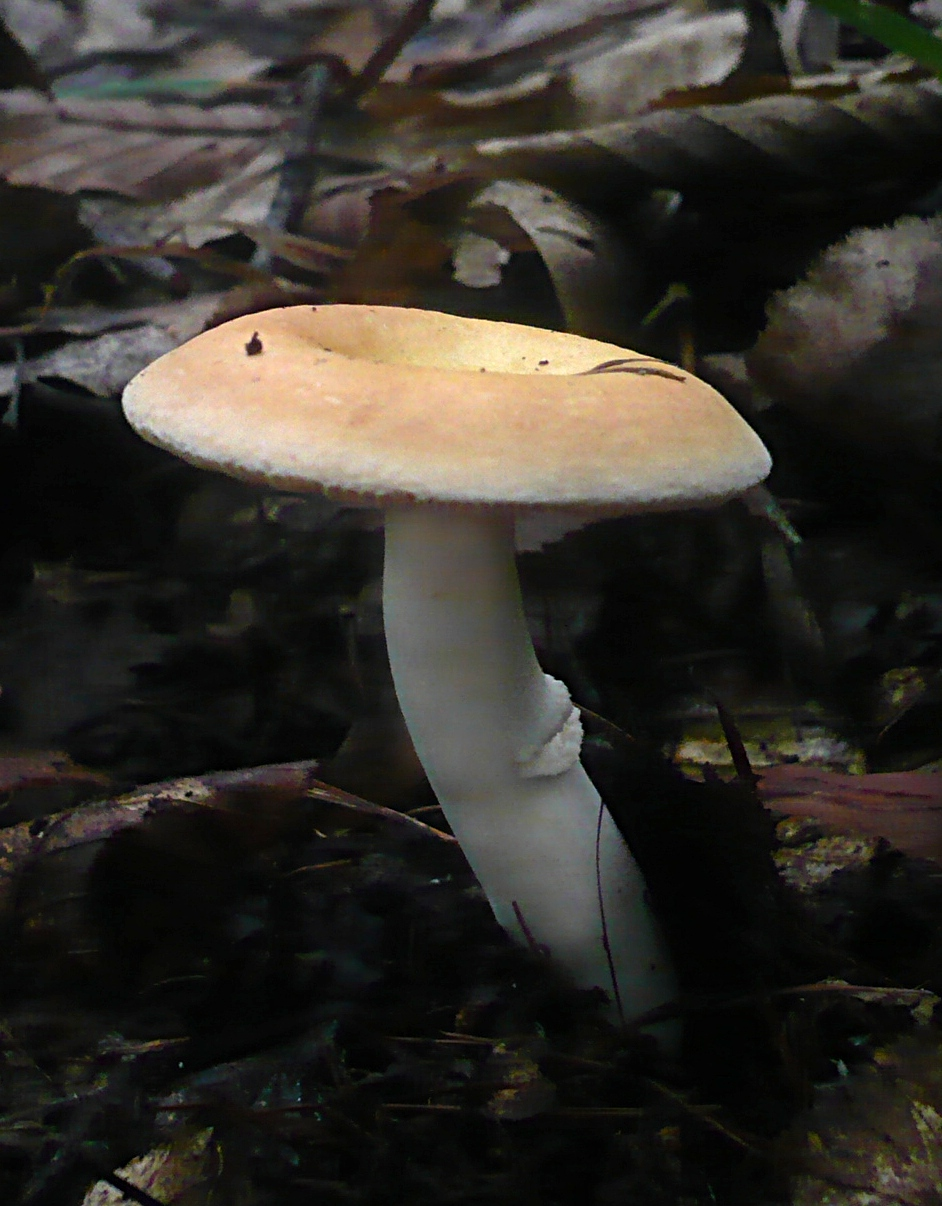

Scientific classification
- Kingdom: Fungi
- Division: Basidiomycota
- Class: Agaricomycetes
- Order: Russulales
- Family: Russulaceae
- Genus: Russula
- Species: R. risigallina

Binomial name
- Russula risigallina (Batsch) Sacc. (1915)

Synonyms
- List: Agaricus chamaeleontinus Lasch (1828); Agaricus luteus Huds. (1778); Agaricus ochraceus Alb. & Schwein. (1805); Agaricus risigallinus Batsch (1786); Agaricus vitellinus Pers. (1801); Russula acetolens Rauschert (1989); Russula armeniaca Cooke (1888); Russula chamaeleontina (Lasch) Fr. (1838); Russula lutea (Huds.) Gray (1821); Russula luteorosella Britzelm. (1879); Russula ochracea Fr. (1838); Russula vitellina Gray (1821); Russulina chamaeleontina (Lasch) F. Kauffman (1909); Russulina lutea (Huds.) J. Schröt. (1889); Russulina ochracea (Fr.) J. Schröt. (1889); Russulina singeriana Bon (1986); Russulina vitellina (Gray) J. Schröt. (1889)

= Russula risigallina =

Species of fungus

Russula risigallina is a species of mushroom. It was previously known as R. chamaeleontina. It is a small yellow russula that is edible and palatable, although identifying the species correctly can be difficult. This mushroom can be found in various countries throughout Europe.
