= Dubec =

Neighbourhood of Zagreb, Croatia

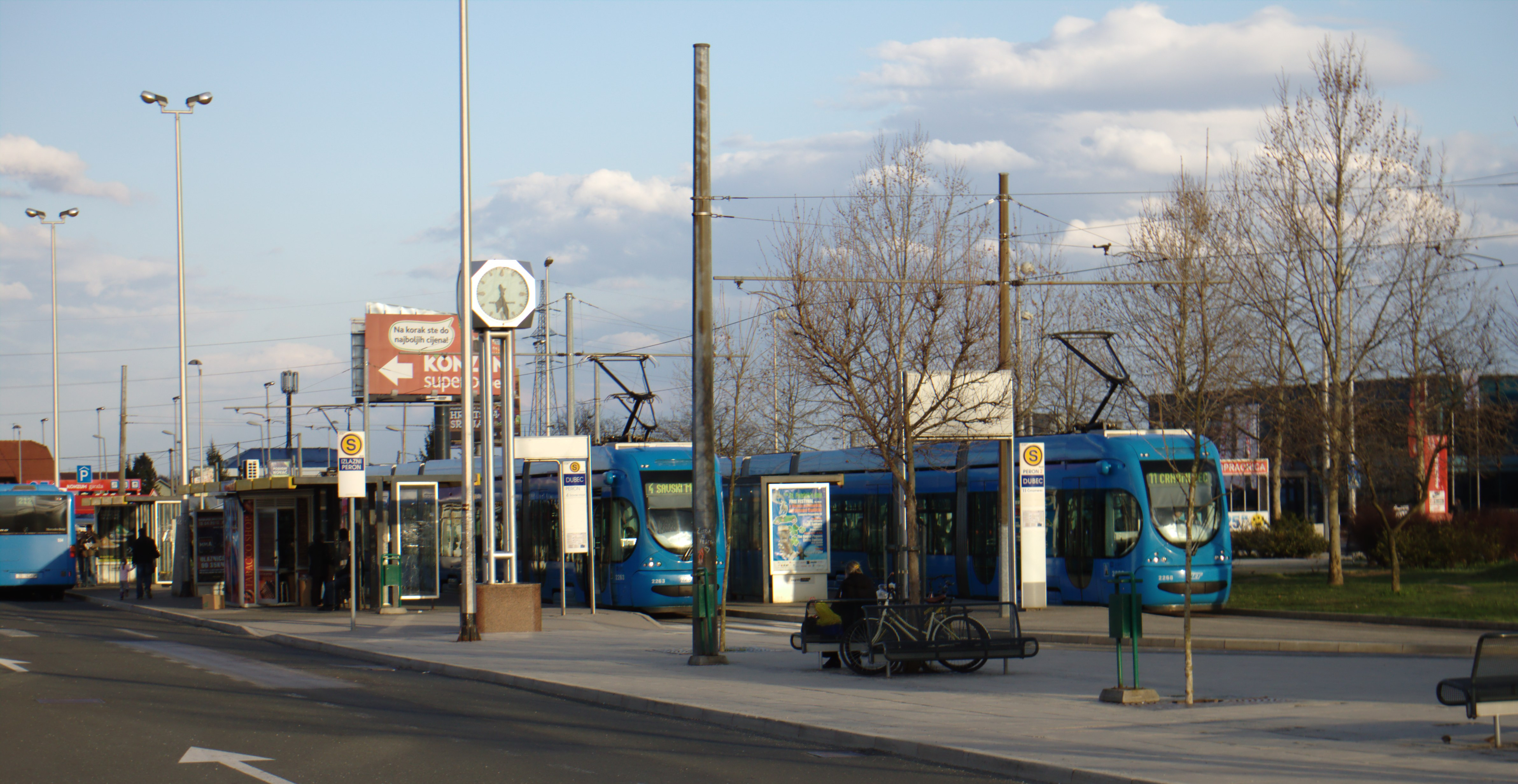
- Tram station in Dubec
- Interactive map of Dubec

Dubec is a neighbourhood in the northeast of Zagreb, Croatia, within the Gornja Dubrava district. The area of the local city council of Dubec has a population of 4,060 (census 2021).

Dubec was part of the municipality of Sesvete since the interwar period, and became part of Gornja Dubrava in 2009.
