= Maksimilijan Vrhovac =

- Bishop of Zagreb
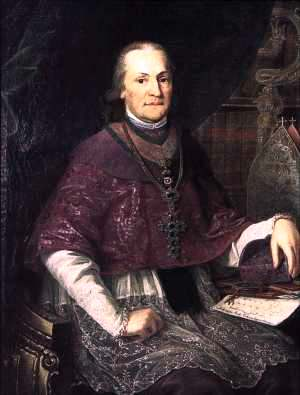
- Church: Catholic Church
- Diocese: Diocese of Zagreb
- In office: 10 March 1788 – 16 December 1827
- Predecessor: Josip Galjuf
- Successor: Aleksandar Alagović

Orders
- Ordination: 24 December 1775
- Consecration: 13 April 1788 by József Batthyány

Personal details
- Born: 23 November 1752 Karlovac, Karlovac Generalate, Military Frontier, Habsburg Empire
- Died: 16 December 1827 (aged 75) Zagreb, Kingdom of Croatia, Austrian Empire

Maksimilijan Vrhovac (23 November 1752 – 16 December 1827) was the bishop of Zagreb. He was one of the ideological architects of the Croatian national revival, and is notable for founding Maksimir Park in 1787, one of the first major public parks in Southeast Europe. Vrhovac was a member of the Freemasons.

== Family ==
His father, Aleksa Vrhovac, was captain of the frontier guards near the Austrian–Ottoman border. For his merit, he was ennobled by Austrian Empress Maria Theresa.

== Education ==
After he graduated school in Graz, Vrhovac joined the army, but soon left when he realized that he did not qualify for this occupation. Instead, he joined the seminary in Zagreb.

Vrhovac studied in Vienna and Bologna, and became a vice-rector, and later rector, at the seminary in Zagreb, as well as a professor of dogma at the Academy in Zagreb. Emperor Joseph II promoted him to rector of the seminary in Pest before he returned to Croatia as a bishop.

== Promotion of the "Illyrian" language ==
In 1808, Vrhovac requested the Croatian Parliament to open his library to the public. In the 1810s, he worked on translating the Bible into the Kajkavian Croatian language. Other contributors in the program were Antun Vranić, Ivan Nepomuk Labaš, Ivan Gusić, Ivan Birling, Stjepan Korolija, and Tomaš Mikloušić. In 1810, he visited Vienna. During his stay, Jernej Kopitar requested that Vrhovac organize a collection of local songs, but this attempt was not successful.

To promote the Ilyrian language, Vrhovac established a printing house and printed books in the Kajkavian and Shtokavian dialects.

Vrhovac continued to pursue his own perception of the language and people. After Napoleon captured the territory of Austria-Hungary, he issued a proclamation in 1813 to "natives across Sava" (Serbo-Croatian: prekosavskim domorocima), emphasizing that there were no more borders between Croats in Croatia, Dalmatia, and the Coastal region. After the defeat of Napoleon in Russia and the return of Austria-Hungary to its borders from 1806, the court in Vienna resented Vrhovac for his earlier behavior. Vrhovac was a distinguished opponent of the expansion of Hungarian influence to South Slavs.

In 1814, Vrhovac's curate Marko Mahanović, following Vrhovac's instruction, published a work titled Observationes circa croaticam ortho-graphiam without taking in consideration Chakavian being only a dialect of Croatian as presented by Jernej Kopitar. Nevertheless, Mahanović did somewhat follow the idea of Kopitar to develop a unified orthography for all South Slavic languages.
