= Crotram =

- Industry: Trams
- Founded: 1986
- Headquarters: Zagreb, Croatia,
- Area served: Worldwide
- Products: TMK 2100, TMK 2200, TMK 2300, TMK 2400

Crotram is a Croatian consortium of two companies, which produces the first Croatian low-floor tram (the TMK 2100, TMK 2200, and the TMK 2300). It consists of Končar and TŽV Gredelj, both from Zagreb. Although theoretically both companies are of the same importance in the consortium, Gredelj produces only 13% of the worth of the tram, producing only bodies for the vehicle, and Končar made general projects for the tram, electrics, electronics, and final assembly. Initially, Đuro Đaković factory was also the part of the consortium, but they have eventually left it soon after the project started, and the development and production of hydraulics and bogie mechanics was transferred to German companies SAMES Hydro-Systemtechnik GmbH & Co. KG and Henschel Antriebstechnik GmbH. New model TMK 2400 is made by one company Končar.

== TMK 2100 ==
TMK 2100 is a tramcar vehicle produced by Croatian companies Končar and TŽV Gredelj, between 1994 and 2003, using parts from TMK 201. The prototype was made in 1994, and serial production began in 1997. 16 trams have been ordered and delivered for the City of Zagreb.

== TMK 2200 ==
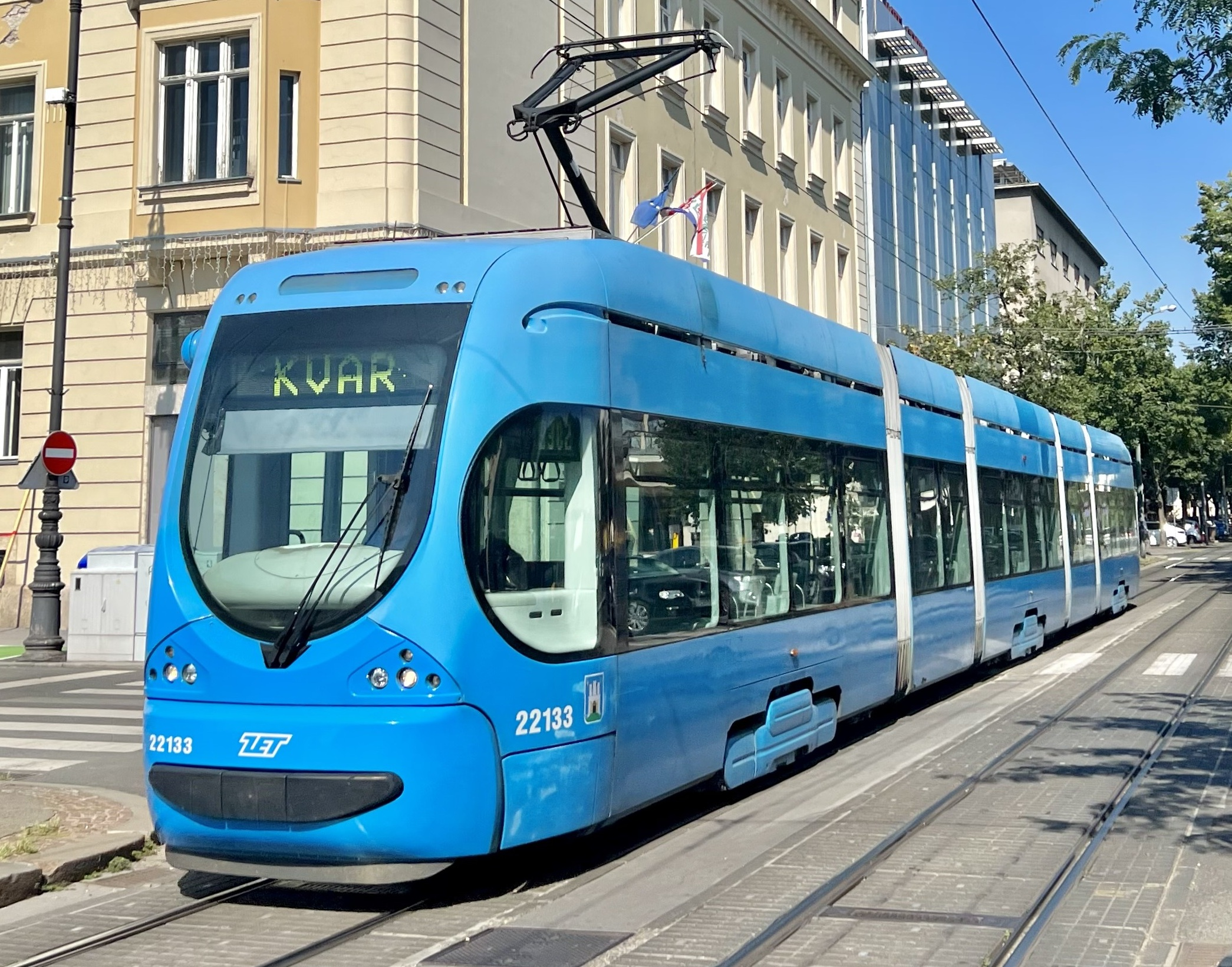
TMK 2200 in 2022

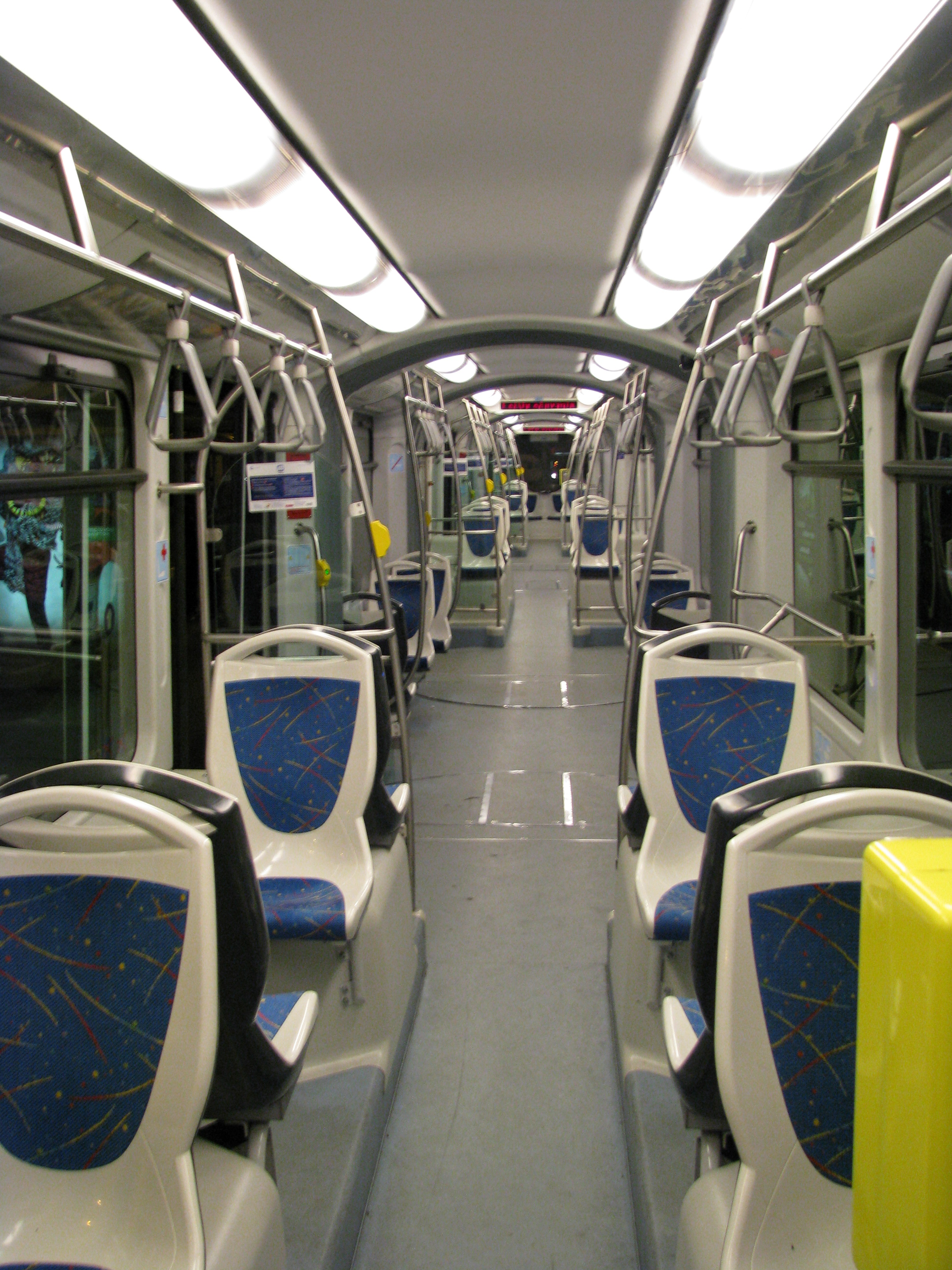
Interior of TMK 2200

The TMK 2200 (also known as NT 2200) is a low-floor tram that operates in Zagreb, the capital of Croatia. ZET (tr. Zagreb Electric Tramways, the city public transportation company), ordered 70 vehicles in 2003 after Crotram consortium won the tender on the ground of lower price, competing with offers by Siemens (Combino) and AnsaldoBreda (Sirio).

== TMK 2200 K ==
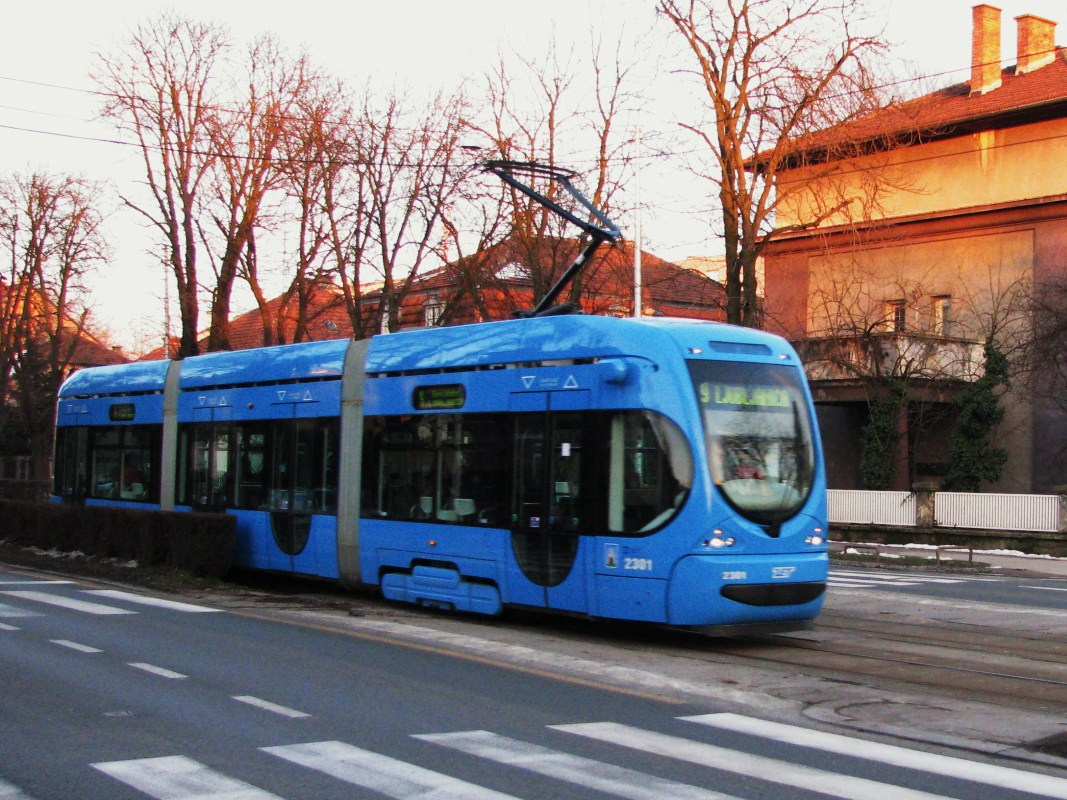
TMK 2200-K in Zagreb

TMK 2200-K is a shorter version of TMK 2200. Two have been delivered, 14 to be delivered to Liepāja, and ZET planning to order 60 more of them. TMK 2200-K is listed as TMK 2300 in ZET register.

== TMK 2300 ==
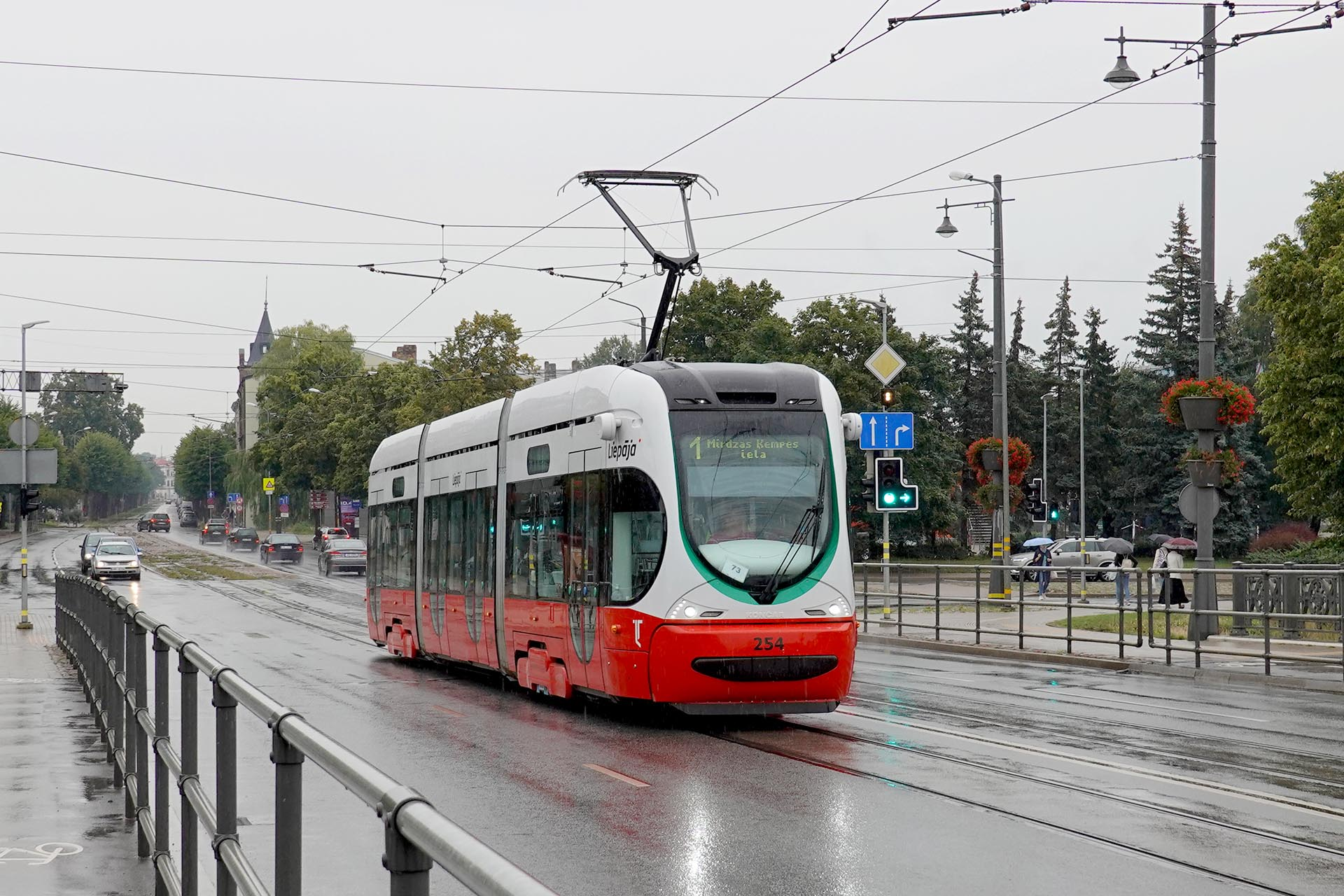
TMK 2300 in Latvia

Operated by two users, ZET in Zagreb, and Liepājas tramvajs of Liepāja, Latvia.

== TMK 2400 ==
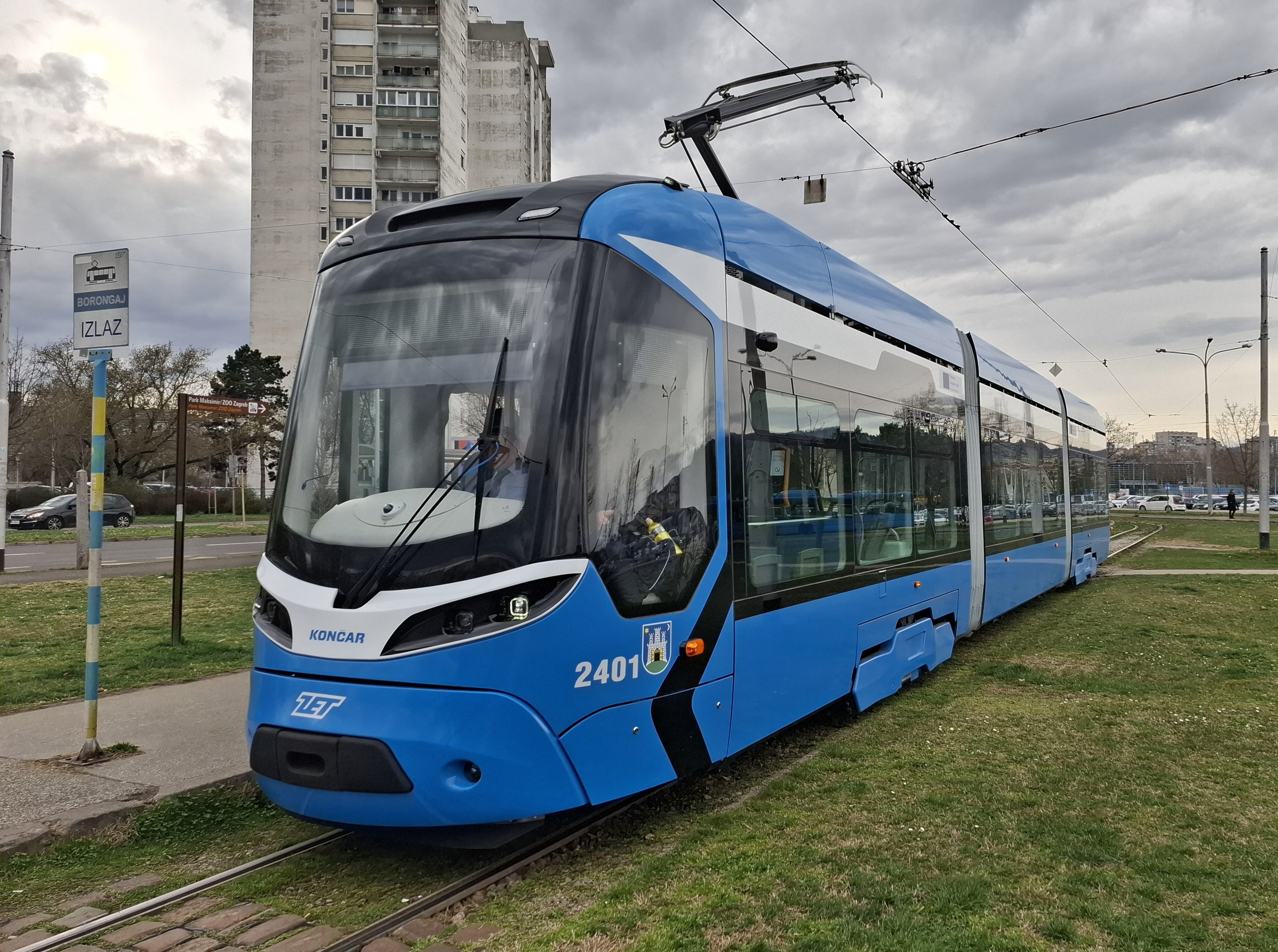
TMK 2400 in Zagreb 2025

== Bibliography ==
Helsinki City Transport

- "Helsingin uudet raitiovaunut toimittaa Transtech" (in Finnish). HKL. 2010-12-02. Archived from the original on 2010-12-13.
