= Trams in Liepāja =

Tram system in Liepāja, Latvia

- Tramvaju satiksme Liepājā
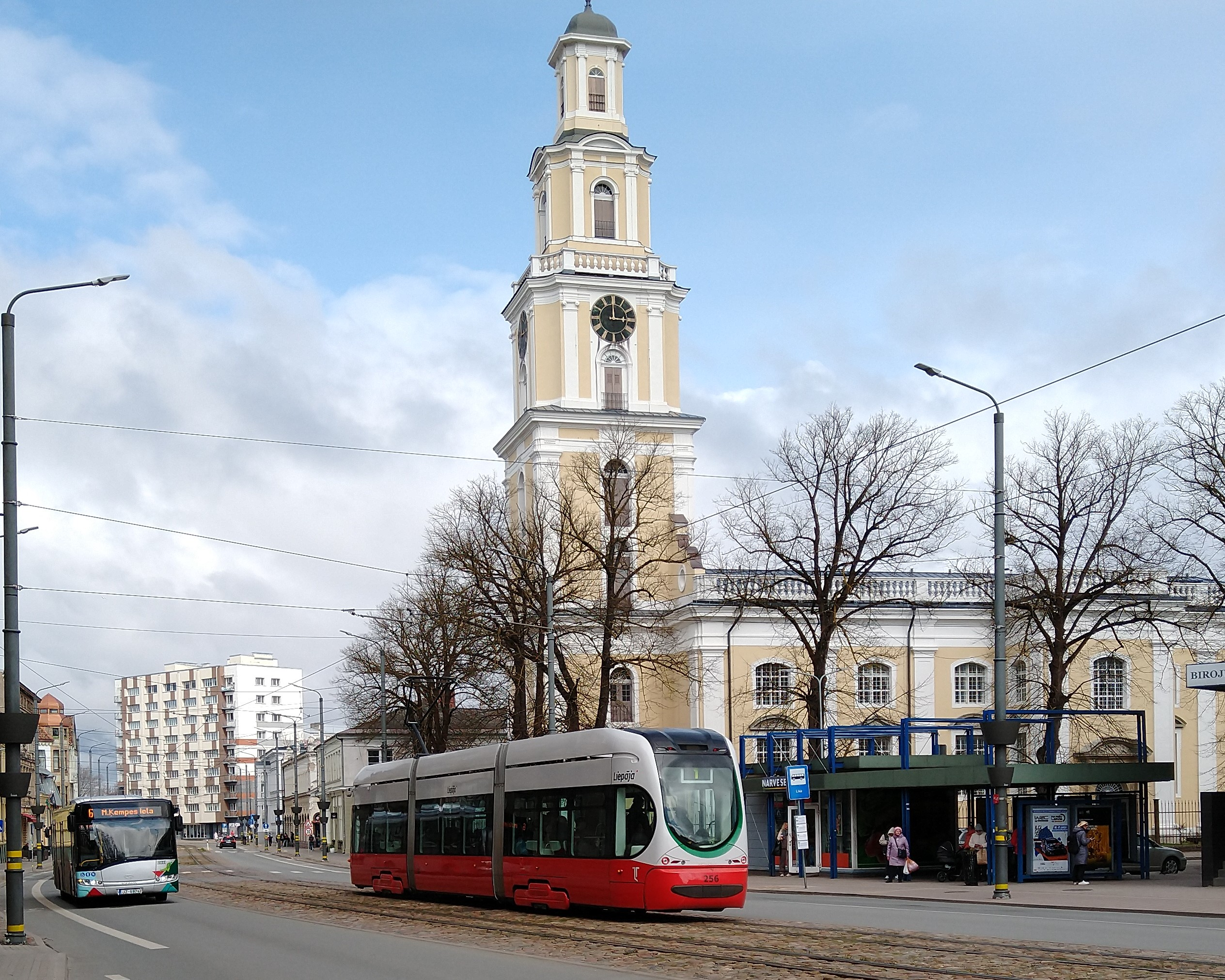
- A Končar tram passing Holy Trinity Cathedral in 2024

Operation
- Locale: Liepāja, Latvia
- Open: 1899; 127 years ago
- Status: Operational
- Lines: 1
- Operator: Liepājas tramvajs

Infrastructure
- Track gauge: 1,000 mm (3 ft 3 3/8 in) metre gauge
- Propulsion system: Electric
- Stock: Tatra KT4SU; Tatra KT4D; Končar TMK 2300

Statistics
- Route length: 7.9 km (5 mi)
- Stops: 18
- Type: state owned
- Industry: transportation
- Founded: 1899
- Headquarters: Liepāja, Latvia, 56°31′19″N 21°01′05″E
- Key people: Aigars Puks, CEO
- Revenue: 776000 LVL (2009)
- Number of employees: 70
Overview
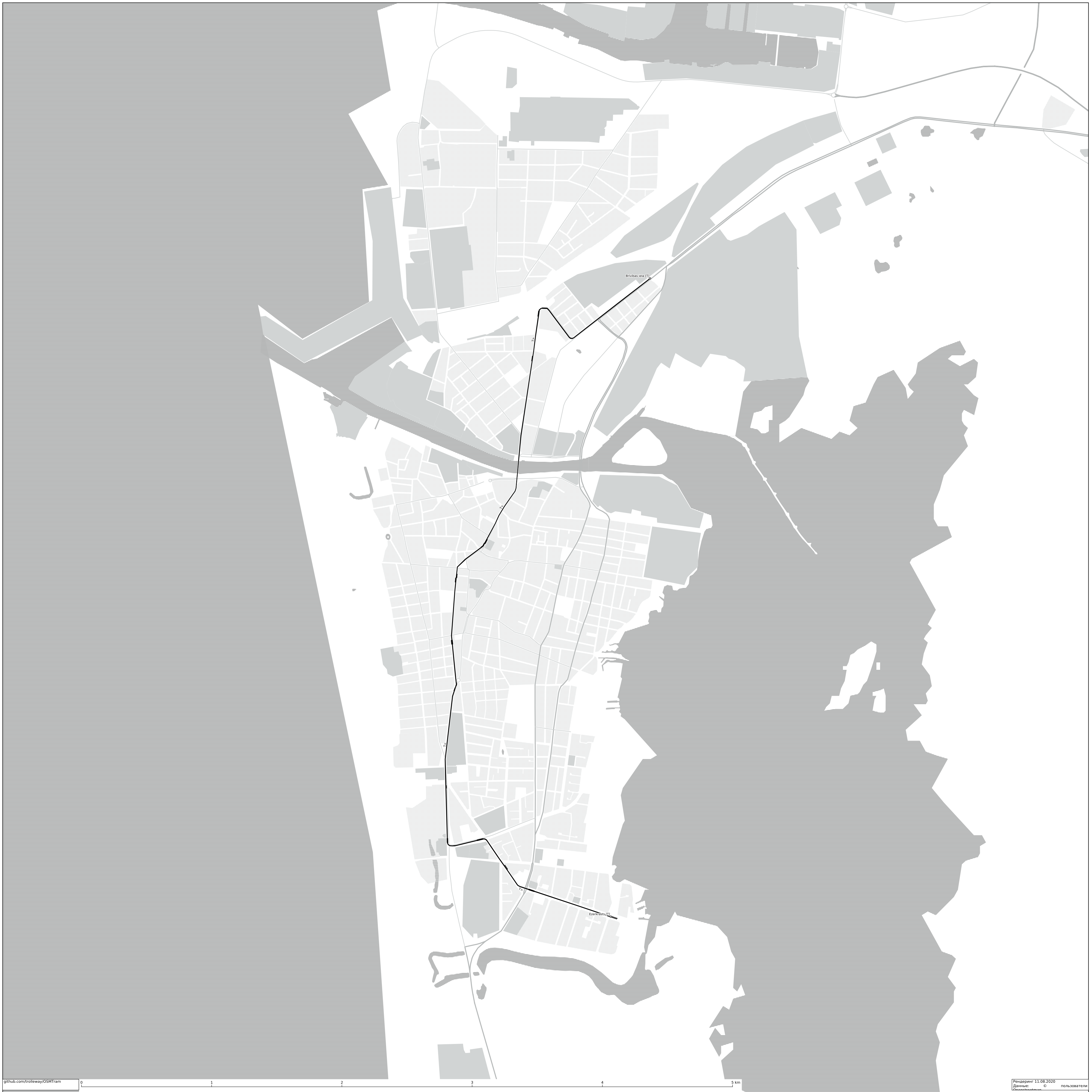
- Website: http://liepajas-tramvajs.lv/lv

Trams in Liepāja consist of a single tram line. The current double-tracked tram line has a length of 7.9 kilometres (4.9 mi) operated by the municipal company Liepājas tramvajs.

== History ==
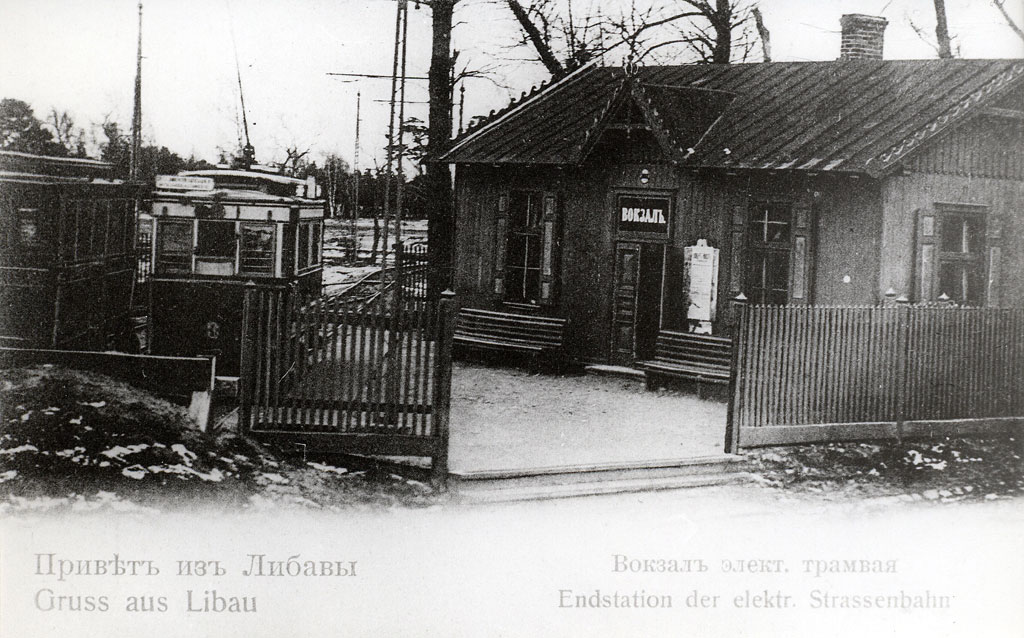
The tram depot circa 1900

The first electric tram line in the Baltic states was founded in Liepāja, September 26, 1899. The first nine trams used by the company were made by Herbrand (based in Cologne). The first tram line was built to Karosta.

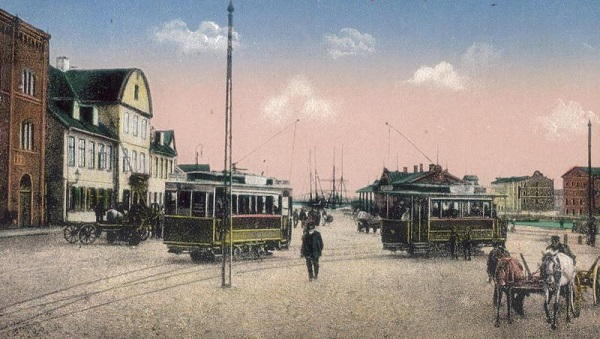
Trams in 1910

In 1903 the company ordered six new trams from Herbrand. The new trams received numbers 10 to 16.

In 1904, a two-way tram line has been built at Liela street in the city center.

In 1940, after World War II the old Herbrand trams has been placed to new self-made frames. 18 March 1941 for the first time since 1899 the woman (Anna Cekuse) has become the conductor. The company starts to use tree-digit numbering, precessing tram number with 1. In 1949-1956 few trams has been built in Liepāja using the details from Kaliningrad and self-made frames.

In 1957 Liepājas tramvajs has received 8 Gotha T57 trams with numbers 125–132.

In 1960, Liepāja has received 10 new trams of the type Gotha Т59Е with the numbers 139–148 in 1961. In 1962 8 new Gotha T2-62 with numbers 149–156 were bought.

In 1974 Liepājas tramvajs has transported 12 million passengers per year.

In 1990, new tram-stops with advertisement displays has been built in Liepāja by EuroAWK.

In 2007, there were widely discussed plans to extend the tram line to the Ezerkrasts district, and the tram company starts to offer new service — payments for the tram tickets by mean of SMS. This service was developed in cooperation with Riga company Citycredit.

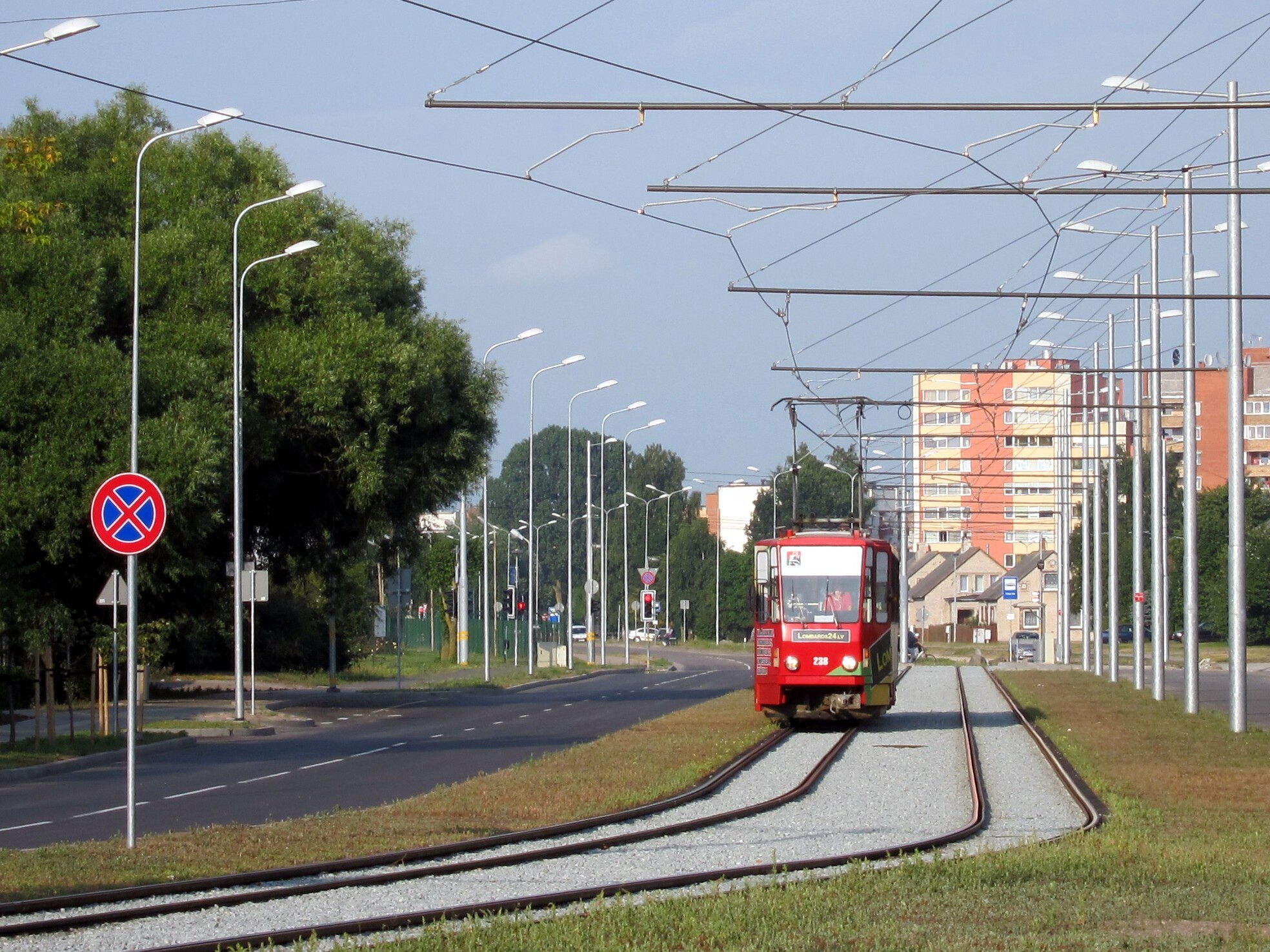
A tram along Tukuma ielā in 2013

In 2013, the tram line to the Ezerkrasts district is made.

=== Končar TMK 2300 ===
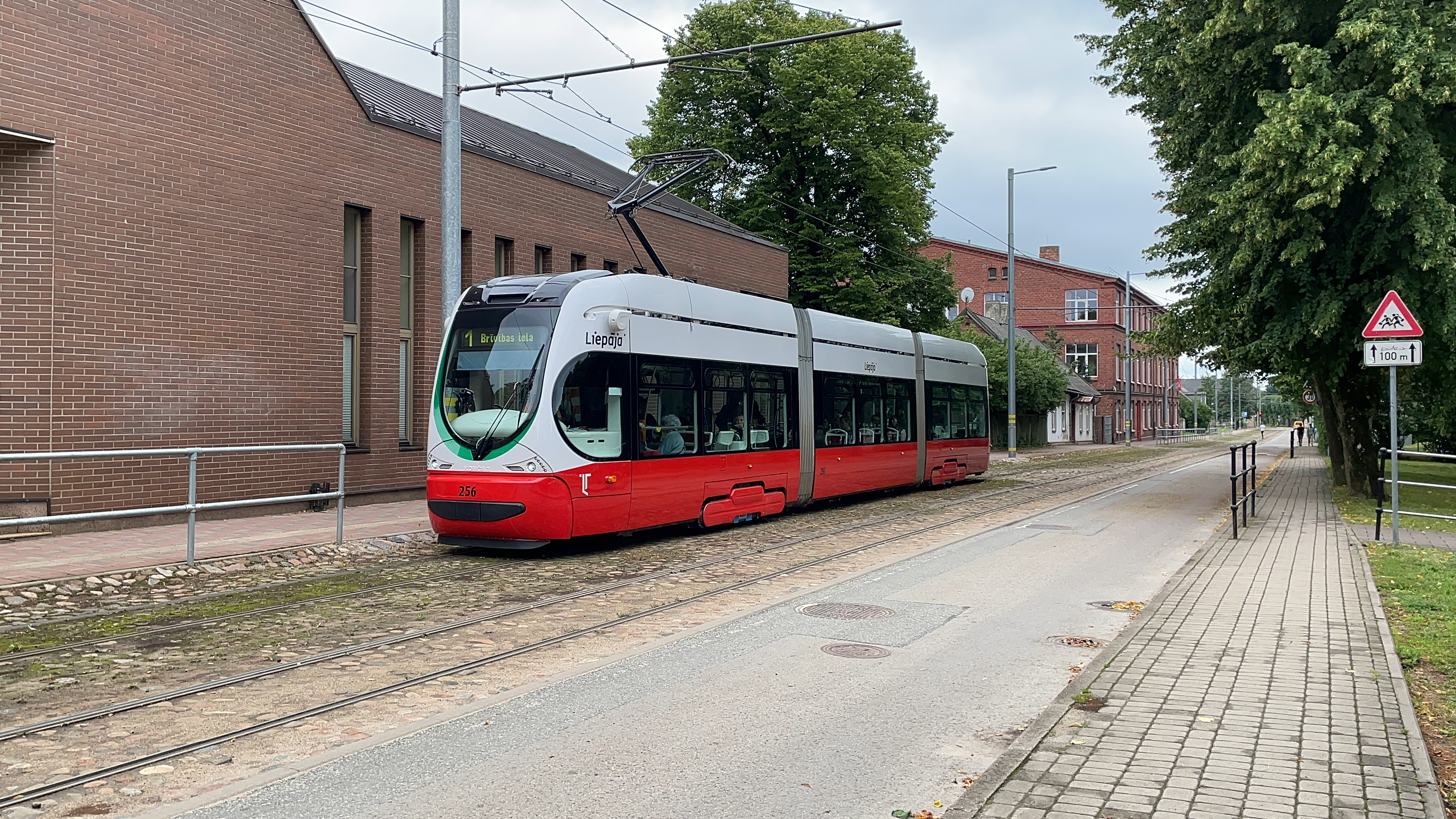
A TMK 2300 in 2023.

In 2018, 12 Končar NT2300 low-floor trams were ordered, with first delivery happening in November 2020, and one Končar NT2300 trams were expected on Liepāja's streets by the end of 2020.

In October 2020, the first Končar NT2300 low-floor tram was being tested in Zagreb's streets, 2 of Liepāja's tram drivers and 2 technicians drive to Zagreb, to learn how to drive the Končar NT2300 tram, also a plan has been made to extend tram line to go to K-Senukai market, to go through Laumas district and go to Karostas bridge.

In November 2020, the Končar NT2300 tram delivery has been started to Liepāja, it will ship through other countries to Germany by land, then it will be loaded onto a ship and delivered to Liepāja by ship. This is the first Croatian tram to be delivered to another country also the first new Liepāja tram has been numbered as №250 which means the other 13 trams will receive numbers from 251 to 262.

In November 2020, the first Končar NT2300 has been delivered to Liepāja and put into Liepāja's tram rails, the old trams are numbered to 247, the number 248 will be given to the "snow white" track cleaner and number 249 will be given to a technical tram when it is purchased in future, also there is a discussion to buy two more trams, so Liepāja will have 14 new trams in total, also the two new tram should come to Liepāja at January 2021 but the first six should all be delivered by May 2021, the new trams are not expected to drive through Liepāja's streets till 2021, when the second Končar NT2300 will be delivered to Liepāja.

In February 2021, the second and third Končar NT2300 have been delivered to Liepāja, and as of 18 February, Liepāja's tram drivers have started to train on how to drive Končar NT2300 trams. The new trams are expected to be in service sometime in March.

In March 2021, the Končar NT2300 trams enter service during Liepāja's 396th birthday, currently all 6 Končar NT2300s are in service.

In November 2022, the last model of Končar NT2300 was brought to Liepāja, which now has 14 trams.

== Fleet ==
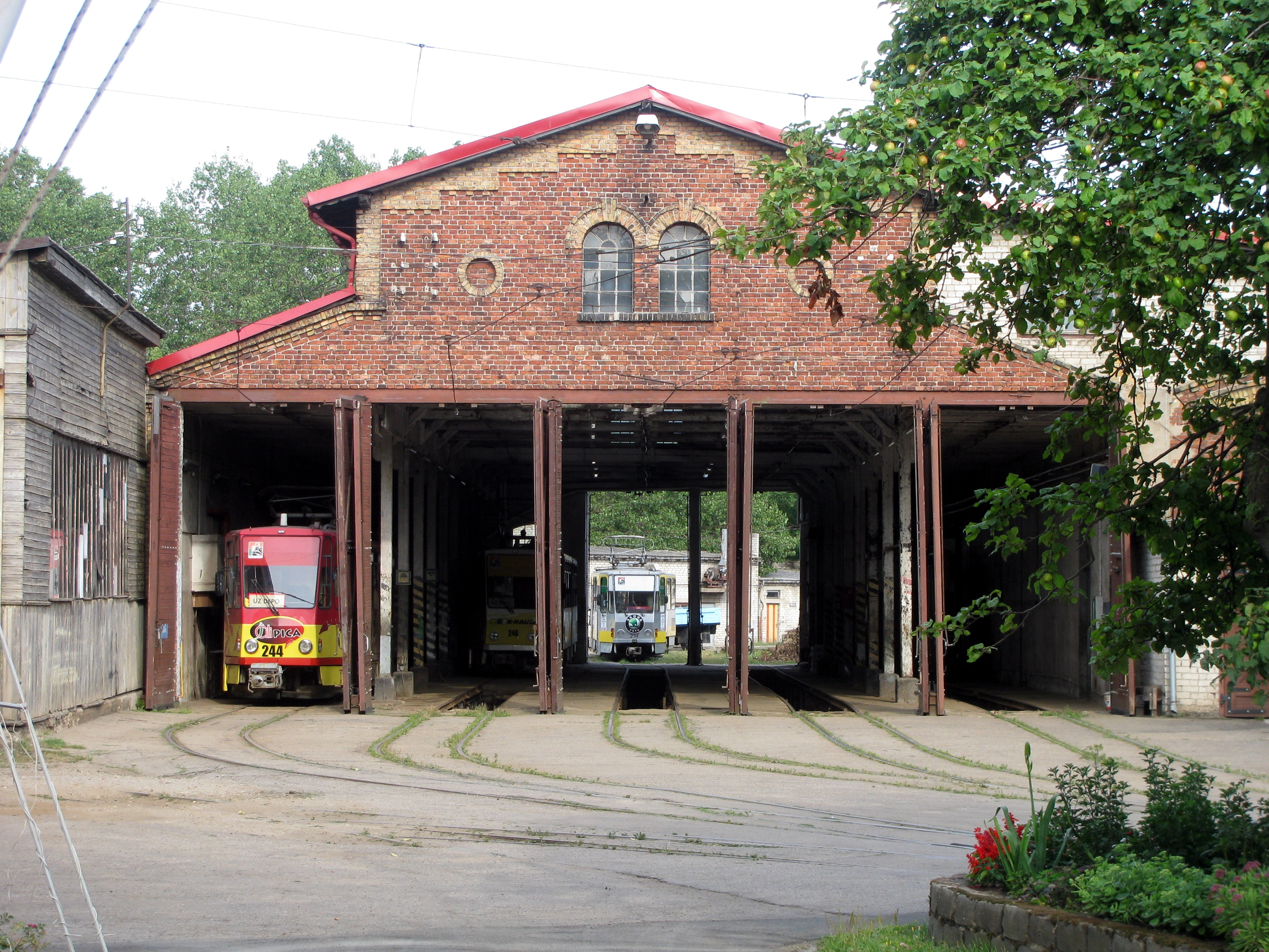
The tram depot in 2013

The current fleet consists of 5 Tatra KT4SU trams that were newly delivered, 11 type KT4D trams formerly in service in Cottbus, Gera and Erfurt, and 6 Končar NT2300's, two of them are in service, in addition to a tram track cleaner called 'Snow White', which was built around the 1920s and rebuilt in 1954, and is the only tram from that time which is still in operating condition. This tram fleet is currently the oldest tram fleet in the Baltics.

== Tickets & price ==
Year	Price	Currency
1900	0.02-0.05	Imperial rouble
1933	0.10-0.15	lats
1946	0.20-0.40	Soviet rouble
1947-1990	0.03	Soviet rouble
1994-2006	0.25	lats
2007-2011	0.30	lats
2012-2014	0.38-0.50	lats
2014-2016	0.38-0.50	euro
2016–2022	0.80 (Note: If buying from other places)	euro
2016–2022	1.00 (Note: If buying from driver)	euro
2023–present	0.90	euro
2023–present	1.50	euro

== See also ==
- Trams in Daugavpils
- Trams in Riga
- Končar TMK 2300
