= TMK 2300 =

Tram model

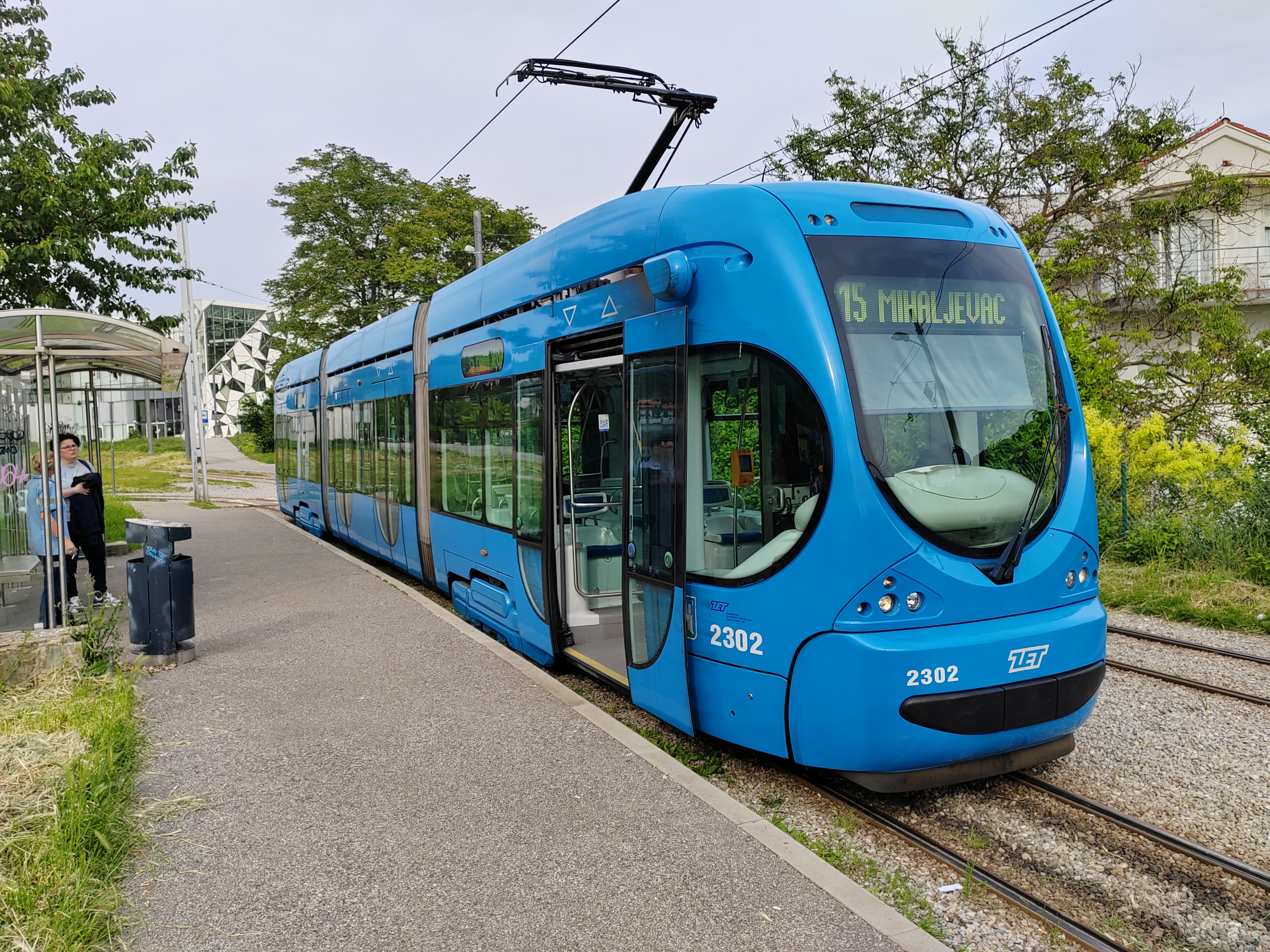
- TMK 2300 in Zagreb
- Manufacturer: Crotram
- Family name: TMK 2200
- Constructed: 2009–2010
- Entered service: 2009
- Predecessor: None
- Successor: TMK 2400
- Capacity: 35 (seated); 95 (standing)
- Operators: ZET; Liepājas tramvajs

Specifications
- Train length: 20.7 m (68 ft)
- Width: 2.3 m (7.5 ft)
- Height: 3.4 m (11 ft)
- Floor height: 0.35 m (1.1 ft)
- Doors: 4
- Maximum speed: 70 km/h (43 mph)
- Track gauge: 1,000 mm (3 ft 3 3/8 in)

TMK 2300 (also known as TMK 2200-K and NT 2300) is a low-floor tram produced by Končar. It began production in 2009, based on further development of its predecessor, TMK 2200, using Končar's proprietary R&D and technology, and entered service that same year. The vehicle was exhibited at 2022 InnoTrans in Berlin.

== Technical specification ==
One unit is 20.7 meters (68 ft) long, 3.4 meters (11 ft) high without the pantograph, 2.3 meters (7 ft 7 in) wide and weighs 28 tonnes (31 tons). It is able to reach a speed of 70 km/h (43 mph), but is restricted to 50 km/h (31 mph) for safety reasons in an urban environment. The tram is equipped with batteries in case of a power outage, giving it an additional 500-metre (1,600 ft) distance at low speed without an external electric source. The vehicle also has a modern passenger notification system, video surveillance, air conditioning and other similar equipment which is housed on the roof together with the pantograph, conductor, transducer and resistors. It has a capacity of 130 people.

As with the previous 2200 model, the bogie is designed as to store wheels in the bearing boxes that form the basic frame. The basic frame is then stored in the chassis (bogie) frame itself, and the axle is replaced by a shaft (connected to the wheels via bevel gears). Secondary and primary suspension is solved by hydropneumatic springs. The engines (2x 65 kW on each chassis) are mounted longitudinally.

== Operators ==
=== Zagreb ===
A total of two units are operated by ZET in Zagreb, Croatia; one was delivered on 29 December 2009, and the other on 1 May 2010. In 2017, further 60 units were planned to be ordered, but this was never realised. Eventually, an order for a new and improved TMK 2400 model was made in 2023.

=== Liepāja ===
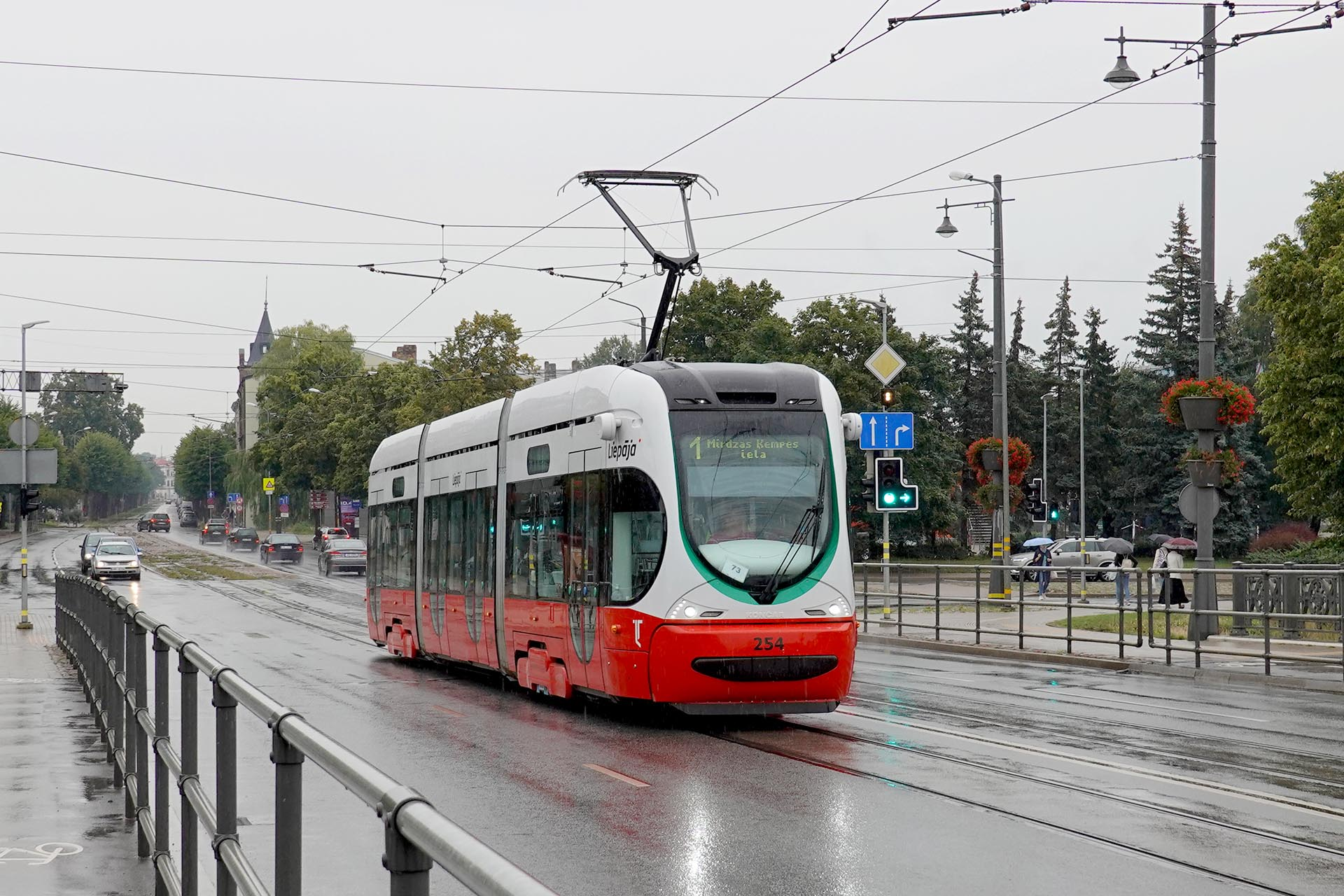
TMK 2300 LT in Liepāja, Latvia

Liepājas tramvajs of Liepāja, Latvia ordered 14 units in 2018, under the name TMK 2300 LT. The purchase was partially financed by the European Union fund 'Tram Line and Adjacent Area Reconstruction Phase 2'. The last of the contracted vehicles was delivered to Liepāja on 14 November 2022.

== See also ==
- TMK 2100
- TMK 2200
- TMK 2400
