= TŽV Gredelj =

Croatian rolling stock company

TŽV Gredelj d.o.o.
- Type: Subsidiary
- Industry: Rail transport
- Founded: 1894
- Headquarters: Zagreb, Croatia
- Products: Rail vehicles
- Number of employees: 300 (2026)
- Parent: Tatravagonka
- Website: tzv-gredelj.hr

TŽV Gredelj (Croatian: Tvornica željezničkih vozila Gredelj d.o.o.) is a Croatian rolling stock company founded in 1894 as the railway workshops of the Hungarian State Railways. After ten years of bankruptcy, the company was sold to Tatravagonka in 2021, a Slovak rail manufacturer. On 6 February 2026, the Tatravagonka management board announced the closure of TŽV Gredelj and the subsequent firing of around 300 employees.

== History ==
The company's history dates to 1894 and the establishment of a railway workshop for heavy repair of steam locomotives. The original factory was constructed in 16 months on the edge of the city of Zagreb (now within the centre of the expanded city), south of the 1890 Zagreb Glavni railway station, for the Kraljevskih južnih željeznica (Royal Southern Railway) between Budapest and the Adriatic.

Housing for plant workers coming from Hungary and Germany was constructed nearby. The factory was expanded and rebuilt in 1911.

Manufacture of railway vehicles began in 1954, with the production of postal wagons. The company later manufactured electric locomotives, wagons, and passenger vehicles.

A new plant was established in Vukomerec, Zagreb in 1968 for locomotive production.

A preservation order for part of the original factory was issued in 2006. Construction of new facilities, and modernisation of existing works in Vukomercu began in 2008. In 2010 the company moved all its production to a new 40,000 m^{2} (430,000 sq ft) factory in the Vukomerec industrial area of Zagreb, constructed and equipped at a cost of 650 million kuna. The city of Zagreb acquired the land of the former factory for €88.2 million.

In late 2012 the company declared bankruptcy, due to reduced overseas orders during the Great Recession, and due to a large reduction in orders from HŽ Putnički prijevoz. At banckrupcy proceedings in Dec 2012, five enterprises were reported as being interested in the plant: Electro Motive Diesel, and National Railway Equipment Company were reported to be interested in parts of the plant relating to locomotive manufacture; investment company Qatari Blooming Heights LLC was reported to be examining the plant for potential middle-eastern investors; the China National Corporation For Overseas Economic Cooperation was also said to be interested in acquiring the plant; HŽ Putnički prijevoz (HŽ Passenger Transport) was reported to be interested in renting part of the plant or equipment to maintain its rolling stock.

From 2012 the company continued to manufacture rail vehicles, honouring existing agreements whilst under bankruptcy conditions. In the year following banckrupcy the company achieved a profit of 9.8 million (Kuna) on 300 million revenue whilst having debt claims of over 700 million.

The market position of this company in recent decades is that it is the regional leader in design, production and maintenance. In the past, it was a major exporter that exported to all world markets, and employed over 1,400 workers. The company once owned large plots of land near Zagreb's main station (130 thousand square meters), which were sold, and the factory was moved to a new one in Vukomerc. HŽ was a large and significant business partner of this factory, which enabled its existence in times of crisis. The world crisis at the end of the 2000s caused a drop in foreign demand for Gredel's products, due to the fact that the financial possibilities of foreign buyers decreased. In 2011, due to unordered trains that HŽ did not order due to lack of money, TŽV found itself in a problematic situation, because it was left without funds that would enable it to survive at least "on the equipment" through the world crisis. Some circles have accused the Croatian Government of "lacking the will to issue state guarantees for the loan that HŽ should be granted by the European Bank for Reconstruction and Development", which is why HŽ has no money, investments have stalled and the company is running out of financial supplies. Despite everything, the company is still a promising business entity, reputable names and reliable products, because its trains are still running on the rails in rich developed countries such as the US, Canada and other countries.

== Products ==
As of 2012 the company produces railway vehicles including coaches, wagons, diesel and electric locomotives, trams, and tram-rail grinding vehicles, as well as components including bogies and lifting equipment. The plant also performs rail equipment maintenance.

== Locations ==
- 45.80549°N 16.05435°E, Vukomerec, Zagreb plant
- 45.80232°N 15.98583°E, former central Zagreb plant

== See also ==
- Đuro Đaković (company), Croatian engineering company, diesel locomotive manufacturer
- Crotram, tram manufacturing joint venture with Končar Elektroindustrija d.d.
