= TMK 2100 =

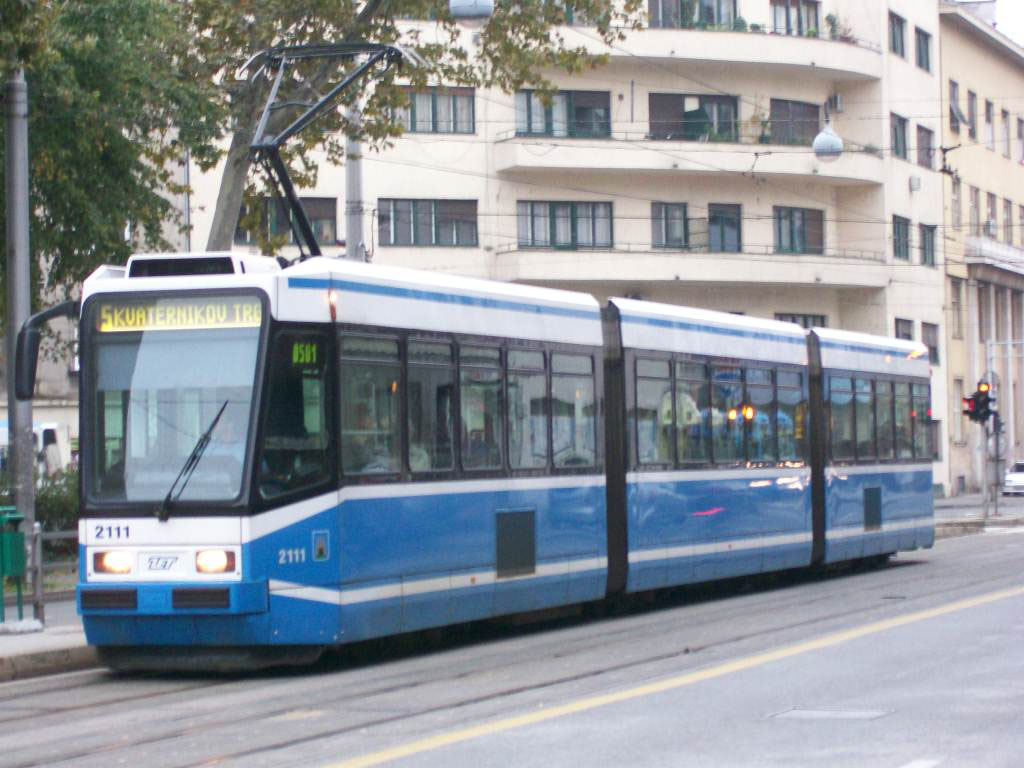
- TMK 2100 in Šubićeva Street, Zagreb
- Manufacturer: Končar; TŽV Gredelj
- Constructed: 1994–2003
- Entered service: 1994
- Number built: 16
- Predecessor: TMK 201
- Successor: TMK 2200
- Capacity: 45 (seated); 119 (standing)
- Operators: ZET

Specifications
- Train length: 27,300 mm (89 ft 7 in)
- Width: 2,200 mm (7 ft 3 in)
- Floor height: 900 mm (35 in)
- Doors: 5
- Maximum speed: 58 km/h (36 mph)
- AAR wheel arrangement: Bo′-2′-2′-Bo′
- Track gauge: 1,000 mm (3 ft 3 3/8 in)

TMK 2100 is a tramcar vehicle produced by Croatian companies Končar and TŽV Gredelj, between 1994 and 2003, using parts from TMK 201. The prototype was made in 1994, and serial production began in 1997. 16 trams have been ordered and delivered for the City of Zagreb.

Construction of steel frame, brake equipment, motor cooling, steel construction of control desk and other auxiliary devices for 16 tram sets, were produced by TŽV Gredelj (Rolling Stock Factory).

== Technical ==
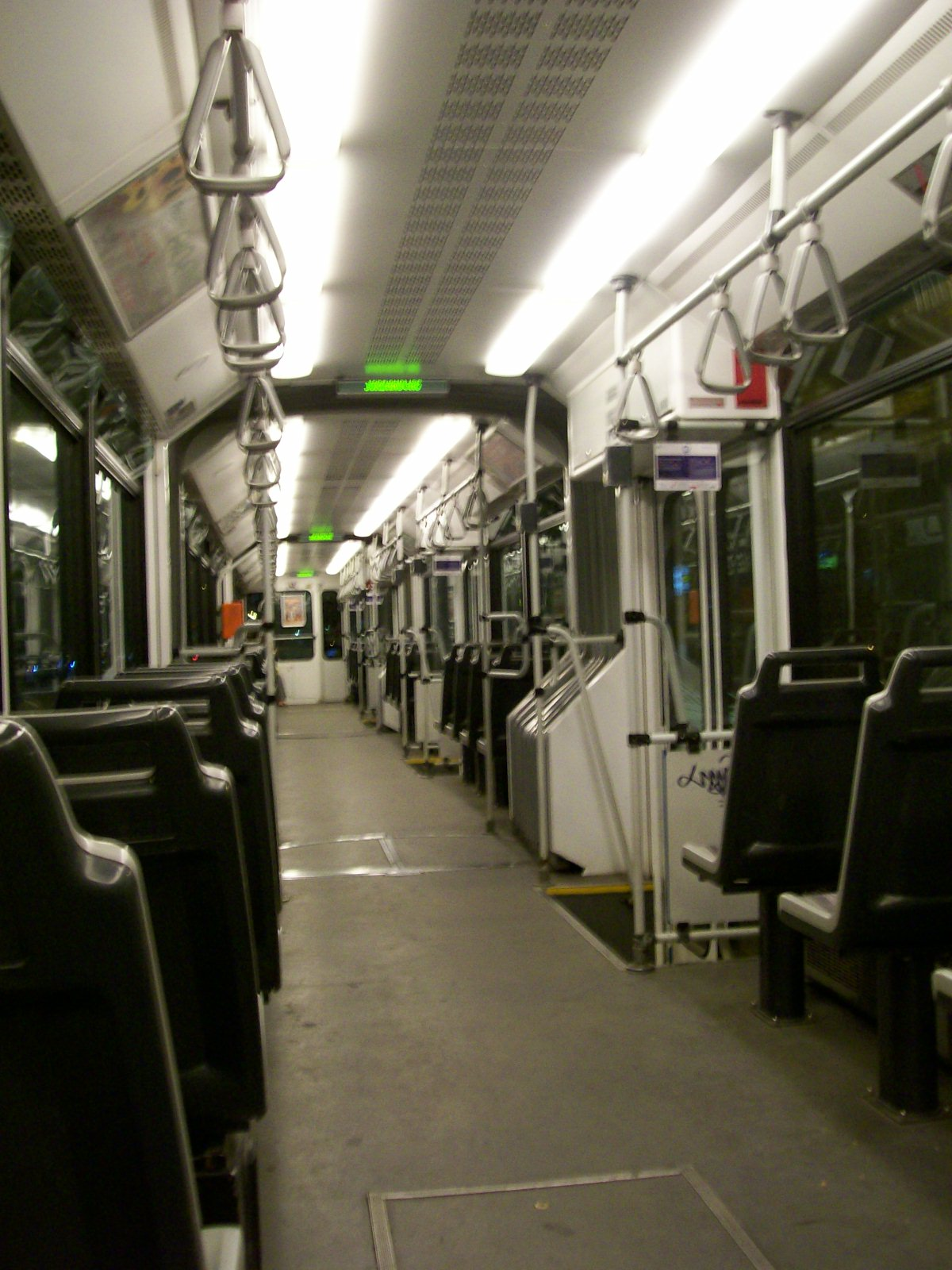
Interior

Technical data:

- system: 600 V, DC
- continuous output: 240 kW
- max. speed: 58 km/h (36 mph)
- wheel arrangement: Bo′-2′-2′-Bo′
- gauge: 1,000 mm (3 ft 3 3/8 in)
- min. curve radius: 16.5 m (54 ft 2 in)
- overall length: 27,300 mm (89 ft 7 in)
- width: 2,200 mm (87 in)
- floor height: 900 mm (35 in)
- seated passengers: 46
- standees: 156 (4 pass/m^{2})

== See also ==
- TMK 2200
- TMK 2300
- TMK 2400
