= TMK 2400 =

Low-floor tram

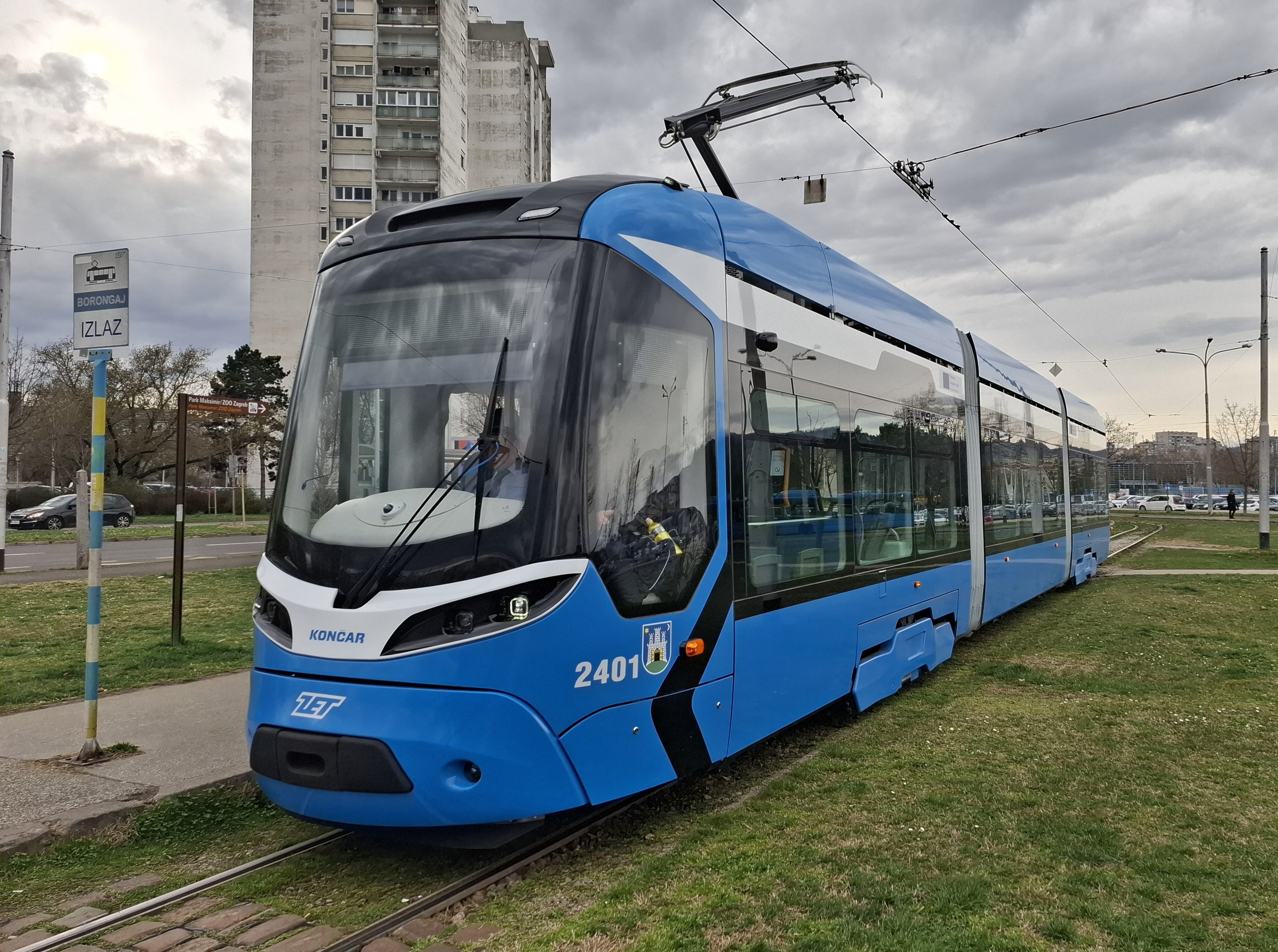
- TMK 2400 on the Borongaj terminal
- Manufacturer: Končar
- Entered service: 2025
- Number built: 25
- Predecessor: TMK 2300
- Capacity: 27 (seated); 88 (standing)
- Operator: ZET

Specifications
- Train length: 20.8 m (68 ft)
- Floor height: 0.35 m (1.1 ft)
- Doors: 4
- Maximum speed: 70 km/h (43 mph)
- Power supply: DC 600 V
- Track gauge: 1,000 mm (3 ft 3 3/8 in)

TMK 2400 (also known as NT 2400) is a low-floor tram built by Končar. They began production in 2023 after the City of Zagreb ordered 20 units. The first unit was delivered on 4 February 2025, after which it was tested and finally put into service on 10 March on Line 1. This model is the first completely new tram in the ZET fleet in 15 years. The purchase worth €47.2 million was financed from the National Recovery and Resilience Plan 2021–2026.

In September 2024, the city ordered 20 additional units worth around €40 million to further update the rolling stock.

== Technical ==
The TMK 2400 model consists of three interconnected articulated modules. The front and rear modules are equipped with bogies, while the middle module is articulated with the adjacent modules and has no axle on the bogie. The vehicle has four entrance doors: one door each on the front and rear modules and two doors on the middle module. It is equipped with batteries that are charged during braking, which reduces electricity consumption and allows the vehicle to continue operating for shorter distances in the event of a power outage.

The low-floor entrance facilitates access for people with disabilities, parents with strollers and elderly passengers. The tram is equipped with USB ports for charging mobile devices, a stop announcement system, and computer monitors that provide passengers with information about the route and stops.

== See also ==
- TMK 2100
- TMK 2200
- TMK 2300
