= TMK 2200 =

Tram in Zagreb, Croatia

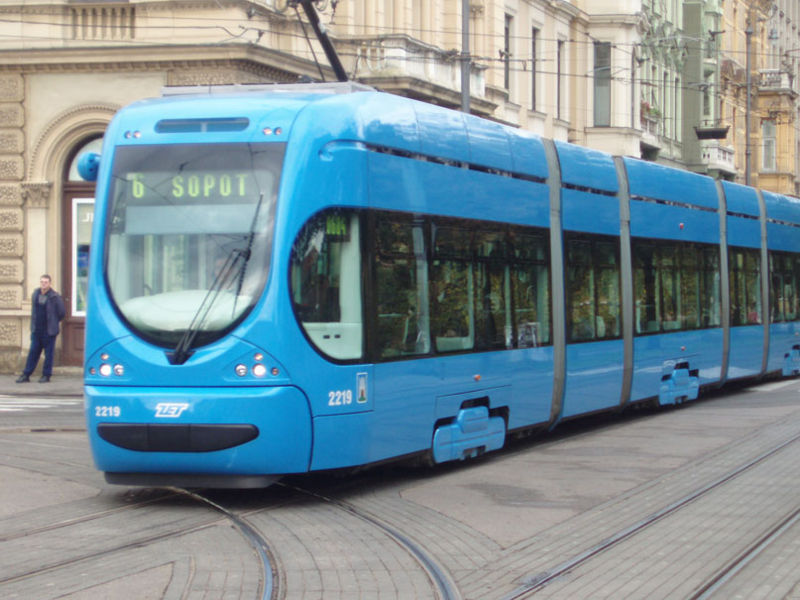
- TMK 2200 at King Tomislav Square, Zagreb
- Manufacturer: Crotram
- Constructed: 2003–2009
- Entered service: 2005
- Number built: 140
- Predecessor: TMK 2100
- Capacity: 46 (seated); 156 (standing)
- Operators: ZET

Specifications
- Train length: 32 m (105 ft 0 in)
- Width: 2.3 m (7 ft 6.6 in)
- Height: 3.4 m (11 ft 1.9 in)
- Floor height: 300–350 mm (1 ft 0 in – 1 ft 2 in)
- Doors: 6
- Maximum speed: 70 km/h (43 mph)
- Minimum turning radius: 16.5 m (54 ft)
- Track gauge: 1,000 mm (3 ft 3 3/8 in)

TMK 2200 (also known as NT 2200) is a low-floor tram that operates in Zagreb, the capital of Croatia. The city public transportation company Zagreb Electric Tram ordered 70 vehicles in 2003 after Crotram consortium won the tender on the ground of lower price, competing with offers by Siemens (Combino) and AnsaldoBreda (Sirio).

The first batch of vehicles was delivered, as the contract requested, from May 2005 until June 2007. Satisfied with the quality of the trams, ZET ordered another 70 vehicles in mid-2007, which were delivered by May 2009. All 140 vehicles ordered by ZET are 32 m long, 5-part version.

The price of the second batch is €130 million (€1.85 m. per vehicle) and is somewhat higher than price for the initial 70 ordered in 2003 (€112 million). However, due to lower production costs the increased price is still very competitive compared to other European equivalents, which are priced up to €2.5 million each per similar vehicle.

Other transport companies also have been interested. International interest in purchasing the TMK 2200 series tramway exists. Although Croatian press articles have suggested many operators being seriously interested in the TMK 2200, the more concrete arrangements so far have been:

- Łódź Regional Tram project, for which the Crotram won on public tendering, but it was eventually annulled and Polish Pesa won the repeated tender,
- In September 2006 an arrangement was made with Belgrade authorities to bring one tram for trial, but the arrangement failed,
- In 2007 HKL (Helsinki City Transport), Helsinki, Finland showed interest for the TMK 2200. Končar sent one of ZETs vehicles (Nr. 2263) to Helsinki on 5 December 2007 and later submitted an offer in the initial round of HKL's tender process for 40 new trams. However, Končar was not selected for the second round and the board of HKL decided on 2 December 2010 to order 40 new articulated trams from the Finnish manufacturer Transtech Oy. The final selection was made between Bombardier, CAF and Transtech. In test service the TMK 2200 received various criticisms, and ultimately HKL decided to acquire trams with a more conventional bogie design,
- In 2008 authorities of Zagreb agreed with authorities of Sofia, Bulgaria to bring one of vehicles for trial. In October 2008 vehicle no. 2282 was sent to Sofia,
- In 2009 Crotram participated in tender for 30 new trams for Belgrade, but the city decided in favour of CAF Urbos.

== Technical ==
The tram is 32 meters long, with three bogeyed and two fully suspended articulated sections, but the modular construction allows longer and shorter versions using the same design of the sections. Wider body and standard gauge versions will also be available for construction.

The tram is entirely guided by synchronous computers. Suspension and articulations are run by hydraulics. Maximum speed is electronically limited to 50 km/h (31 mph), and the trams are equipped with air-conditioning and CCTV cameras.

== See also ==
- TMK 2100
- TMK 2300
- TMK 2400
