= Zagreb Electric Tram =

Croatian transport company

Overview
- Locale: Zagreb, Croatia
- Transit type: Tram; Bus; Funicular; Gondola lift
- Number of lines: 19 tram lines 146 bus lines
- Daily ridership: 490,000
- Chief executive: Marko Bogdanović
- Website: www.zet.hr

Operation
- Began operation: 1891

Technical
- System length: 116 km (72 mi)
- Track gauge: 1,000 mm (3 ft 3 3/8 in) (narrow gauge)

The Zagreb Electric Tram (Croatian: Zagrebački električni tramvaj, ZET) is the transit authority responsible for public transport in Zagreb, the capital of Croatia, and parts of the surrounding Zagreb County.

ZET operates an extensive bus system, 19 tram lines (15 daytime lines and 4 nighttime lines), a gondola lift and a funicular line. Historically, ZET workshops also produced trams (namely, types M-22, M-24 and three TMK 101 prototypes). The vehicles are painted in blue, a recognizable symbol of the city's public transport. ZET offers free public transportation to all citizens over 65 and under 18 years old, starting in 2024 and 2025 respectively.

== History ==
Zagreb Electric Tram was founded in 1891, the year the first horse-drawn trams started operation in Zagreb. The first electric trams started operating in 1910, and the belgian company Compagnie Mutuelle de Tramways was commissioned to build and maintain the tram infrastructure. In 1916, as money was scarce during World War I and the service worsened, the City Savings Bank bought the majority of ZET shares. To improve service, the bank invested in a new workshop for tram repairs, and later, in 1924, in the reconstruction of existing tracks and construction of new ones. In 1929, ZET took control of the Zagreb Funicular. Soon after, in 1931, after ZET merged with City Bus Transport (Croatian: Gradski autobusni promet), it took control of all busses and bus lines in the city. In 1960, it was chosen as the investor of the Zagreb Cable Car, which was opened in 1963. In 1990, the City of Zagreb became the new owner of ZET, and in 2007, it became a subsidiary of Zagreb Holding. In both 2014 and 2017, as part of a restructuring of Zagreb Holding, the City Assembly voted to make ZET once again a public company under the ownership of the city. The change happened in January 2018.

== Management ==
Zagreb Electric Tram is headquartered at Ozaljska 105, located on the Ljubljanica tram depot. It employs 3698 people. Trade Union of Drivers and Transport Workers ZET Zagreb (Sindikat vozača i prometnih radnika ZET Zagreb) is a trade union representing the employees. The management of the company is split between the management board, whose president is the director of the company, and the supervisory board.

=== Directors ===
Name	Tenure
Ludvig Payerle	25 July 1891 – 31 May 1909
Joseph Brand	1 June 1909 – 4 August 1911
Antun Lončarić	4 August 1911 – 1 June 1913
Artur Reicher	1 June 1913 – 29 August 1917
Adolfo Košak	29 August 1917 – 31 March 1939
Dragutin Mandl	1 April 1939 – 11 March 1946
Slavko Milosavljević	11 March 1946 – 14 August 1946
Šime Brnčić	14 August 1946 – 15 December 1947
Nikola Ljubešić (Note: From 17 January 1948 to 6 April 1949, ZET was split into many different enterprises, including Directorate of City Traffic Enterprises (Direkcija gradskih saobraćanih poduzeća), of whom he was a director)	15 December 1947 – 6 April 1949
Slavko Barberić	6 April 1949 – 30 June 1950
Julio Markužić	1 July 1950 – 31 January 1951
Ivan Vasiljević	1 February 1951 – 20 July 1951
Šime Brnčić	21 July 1951 – 19 November 1954
Josip Jug	19 November 1954 – 5 March 1955
Šime Brnčić	5 March 1955 – 22 April 1955
Slavko Milosavljević	22 April 1955 – 19 March 1956
Franjo Mihl	19 March 1956 – 1 March 1963
Ivan Horvatić	1 March 1963 – 1 April 1971
Stjepan Potlaček	1 June 1971 – 29 February 1976
Dragutin Kračun	1 March 1976 – 17 May 1976
Branko Rački	17 May 1976 – 11 March 1987
Zvonimir Kovačić	11 March 1987 – 30 September 1987
Julius Pevalek	1 October 1987 – 5 October 2006
Ivan Tolić	7 October 2006 – 12 May 2010
Dubravko Baričević	13 May 2010 – 14 November 2013
Ivan Tolić	15 November 2013 – 30 October 2014
Ljuba Romčević Žgela	31 October 2014 – 31 January 2022
Marko Bogdanović	Since 1 February 2022

== Ticketing system ==
Tram and bus tickets can be bought at standard or specialized ZET kiosks or in the vehicle from the driver, though for cash only. Yellow ticket scan machines are located next to the driver cabin in a bus, and at the front and the back of a tram. Starting in 2024, it is possible to deposit money into the MojZET app and scan the QR code next to the doors to buy the ticket. ZET sell monthly and yearly transport passes, which people under 18 and over 65 get for free but have to have a transport card present, while students and people with disabilities get a discount. Ticket inspectors enforce the rules.

== Ridership ==
According to research from 2005, urban public transport allowed for approximately 41.26% of all trips in Zagreb.

Year	Number of passengers	Change (%)
2017	288,470,000	-
2018	273,343,000	▼5.24
2019	261,992,000	▼4.15
2020	187,881,000	▼28.92
2021	170,638,000	▼9.18
2022	170,679,000	▲0.02
2023	158,673,000	▼7.03
2024	179,095,000	▲12.87

== Services ==
=== Tram ===
The first tram line was opened on 5 September 1891, setting off a vital part of the Zagreb mass transit system. The first electric trams started operating on 18 August 1910. Today, Zagreb features a tram network of 259 trams on 15 day and 4 night lines running over 116 km (72 mi) of tracks through 261 stations and transporting little under 490,000 passengers per day. The majority of stations serve multiple tram lines. Trams are more frequent on work days, especially during rush hour, and the least frequent on Sunday. Daytime lines come every 5-15 minutes on average.

It's fleet consists of the tram types T4YU, KT4YU, TMK 2100, TMK 2200, TMK 2300, GT6M and TMK 2400.

=== Bus ===
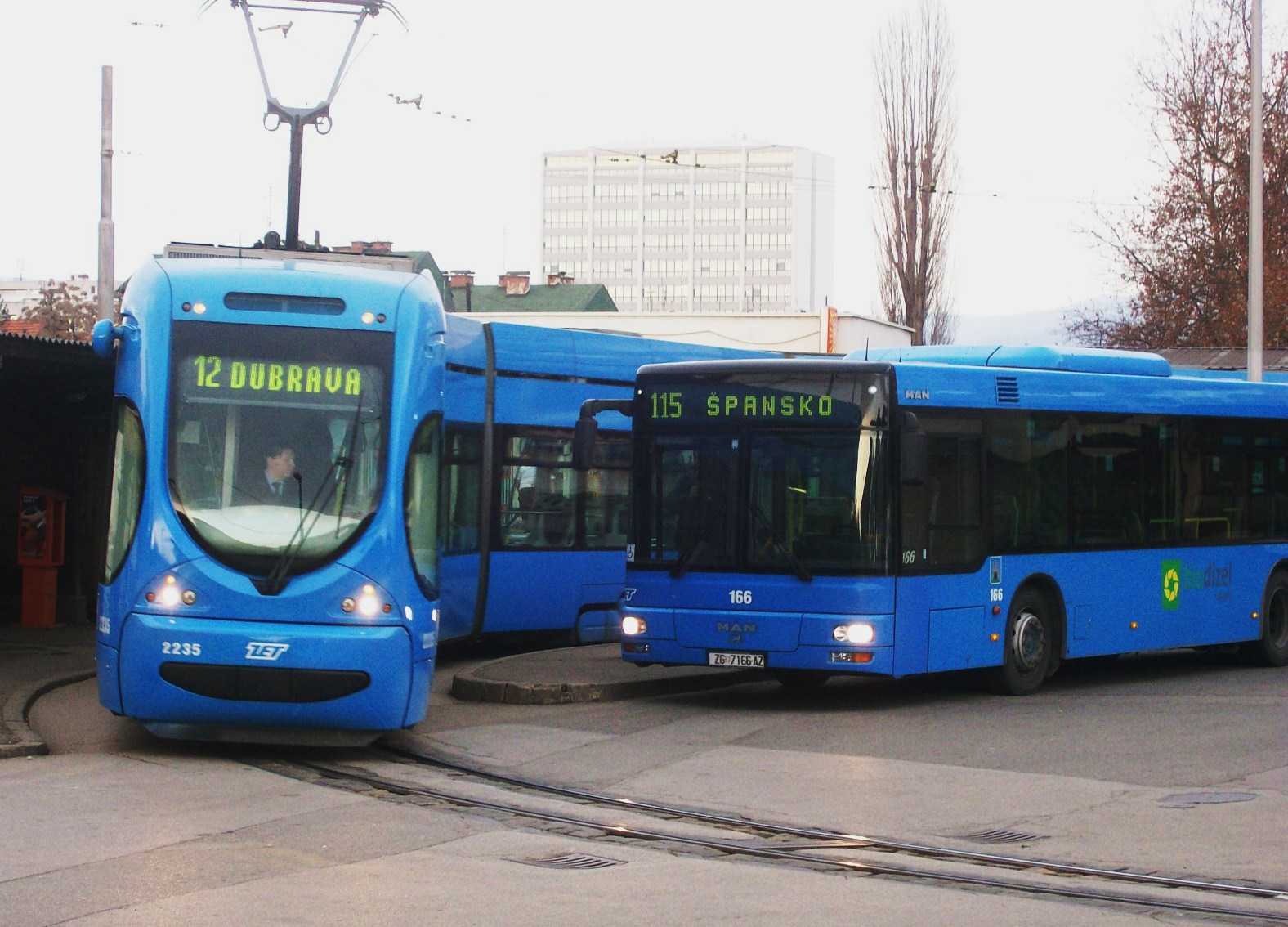
Modern ZET tram and bus

Bus transport was introduced in Zagreb in 1927, and was first managed by the enterprise Bus Transport (Autobus promet). In 1930, the concession was given to V. & M. Barešić & Company and their affiliate company Autobrzovoz. The City Savings Bank took control of the bus system in 1931 and commissioned the enterprise City Bus Transport (Gradski autobusni promet) to manage the lines, which later merged with ZET. Starting out small, the network has since expanded to 146 bus lines, consisting of 480 buses. The buses primarily run outside the city center where there are no trams, in the suburbs and to nearby cities, such as Zaprešić, Velika Gorica, Bistra, etc. Bus service frequencies vary significantly between lines. Timetables are available at the stops and online.

The current stock consists of MAN, Mercedes-Benz and Iveco buses, all of them low-floor. In 2007, ZET started using 10 biodiesel busses, and in 2008 it bought 60 CNG buses, but since the city had no adequate CGN pumps, the busses were barely used until 2014, when a proper pump was built. The first electric bus was put into service in April 2025.

==== City bus gallery ====
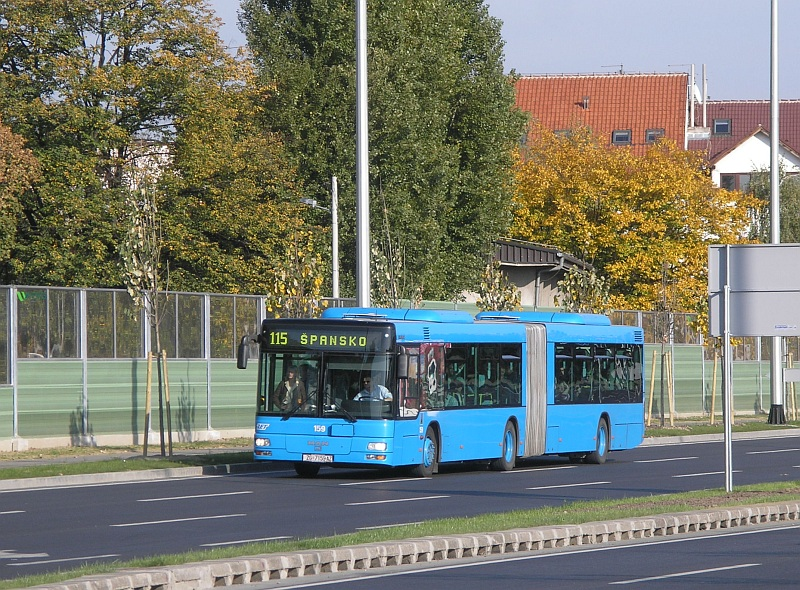
MAN NG 313 at the Zagrebačka Avenue

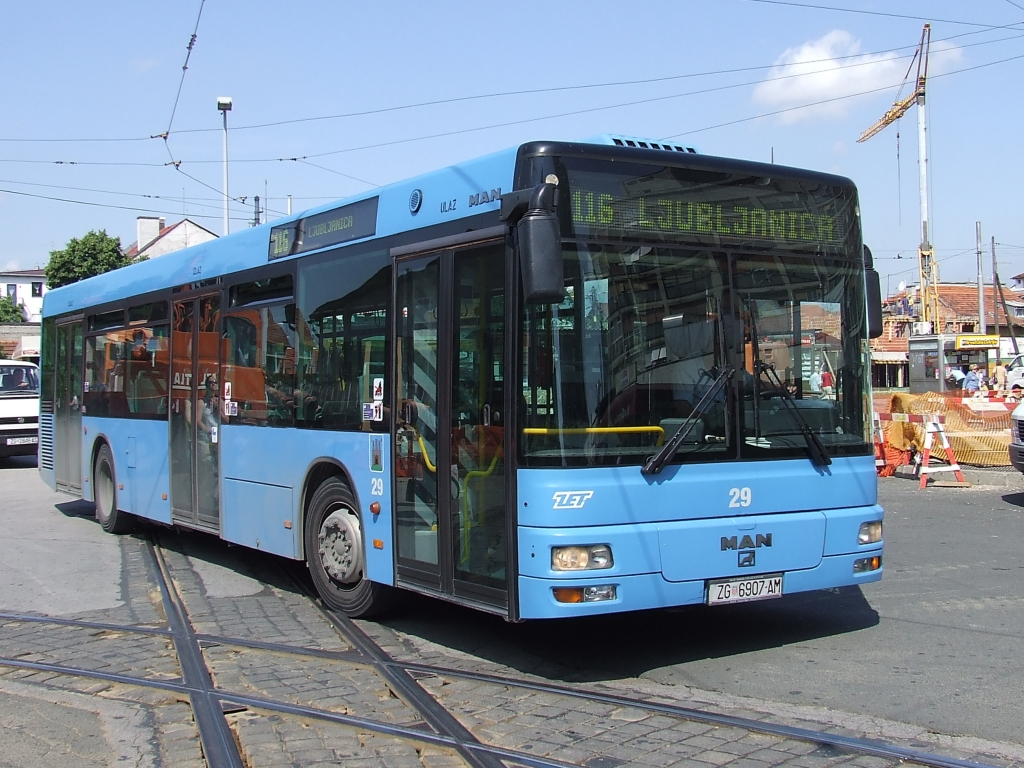
MAN NL 263 at terminus Ljubljanica

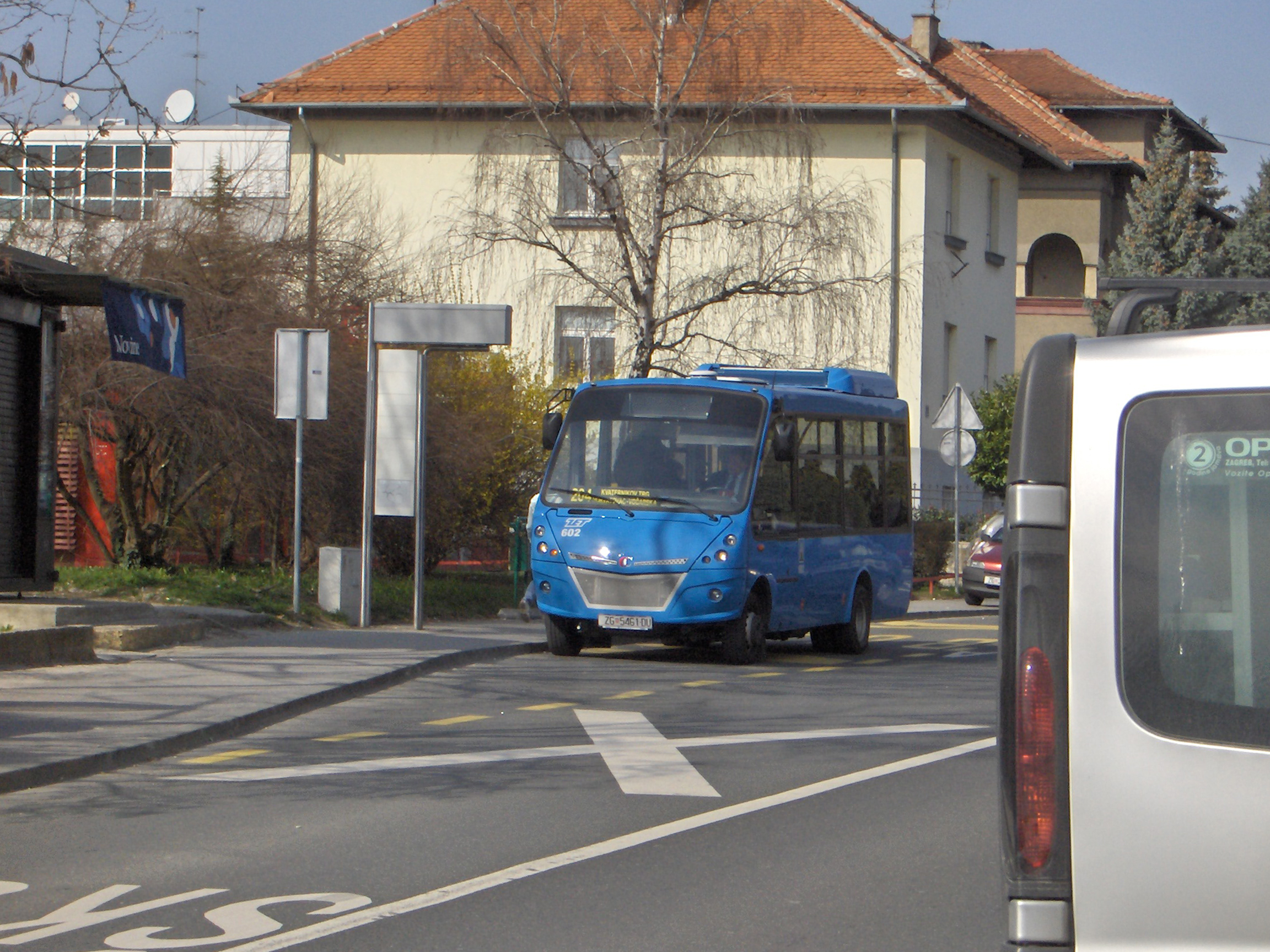
A minibus in Šalata

=== Funicular ===
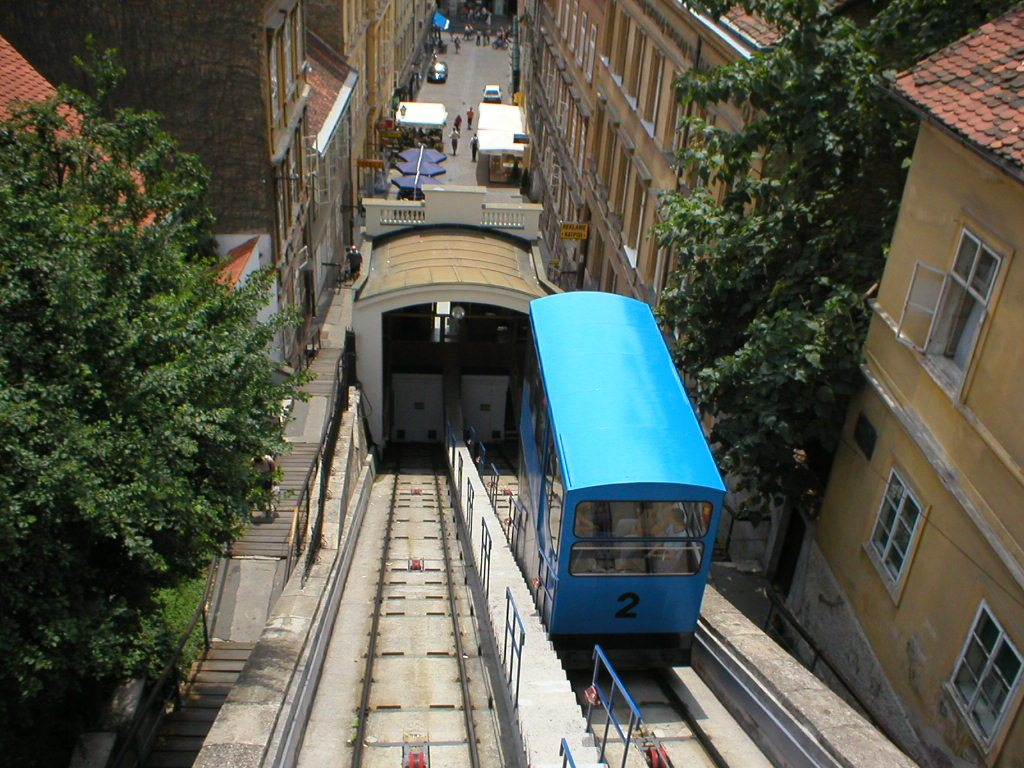
ZET funicular

The only funicular in Zagreb is operated by ZET, connecting Ilica through Josip Eugen Tomić Street with Strossmayerovo Promenade to the north, on the Upper Town. The funicular was built by David William Klein and opened on 8 October 1890, starting permanent operation on 23 April 1893. In 1929, the funicular became property of the City of Zagreb, and ZET took control of the maintenance and the finances of the funicular. In 1934, the steam engines were replaced with an electric drive system. It has two cars for 28 passengers each, and with a speed of 1.5 m/s takes 1 minute to complete the trip. It runs on a 1200 mm gauge track, with a length of 66 m and height 30.5 m, and inclination 52%, or 27.52°.

=== Gondola lift ===
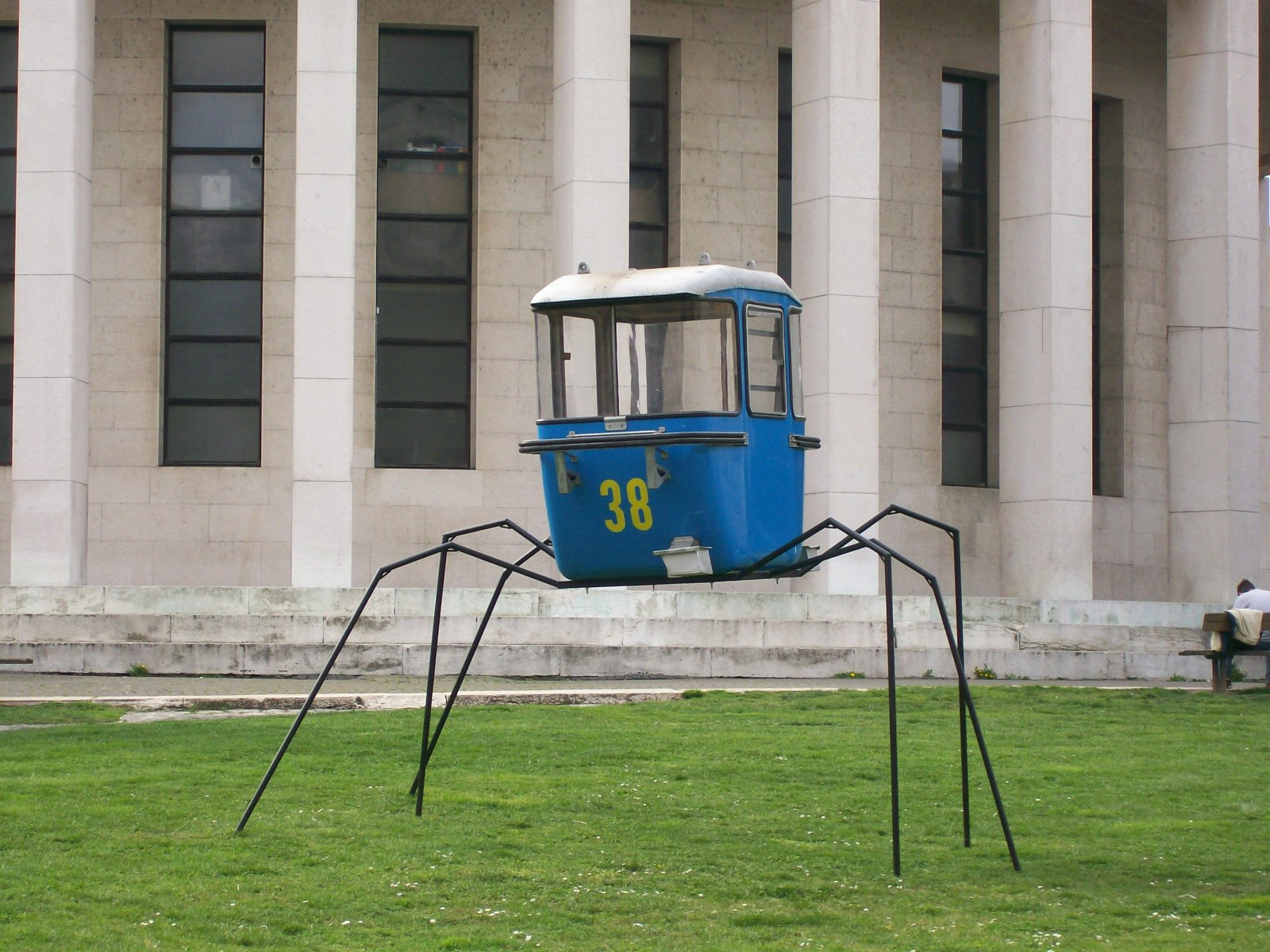
Old passenger cabin as a sculpture

ZET was the investor of the first gondola lift in Zagreb, which started construction in 1962, and was opened in July 1963, in use until 2007. It had 88 cabins, each for 4 people. It took 23 minutes to get to the top of Medvednica, with a height difference of 670 m. In 2007, after one of the electric motors broke, it was concluded that the repairs would be too expensive, and the gondola lift was permanently closed.

The new gondola lift was opened in 2022 and has 84 cabins, able to transport 1500 people per hour. The route is 5017 m long with a height difference of 754 m. The ride lasts for from 16 to 22 minutes, depending on the speed, which is around 20 km/h. The new cabins are accessible to people with disabilities and bycicles.

=== Other services ===
- Vans for transporting people with disabilities
- Fulir, electric vehicles intended for transporting elderly people in the pedestrian zone in the city centre
