= KONČAR Group =

Rolling stock manufacturer

KONČAR – Elektroindustrija d.d.
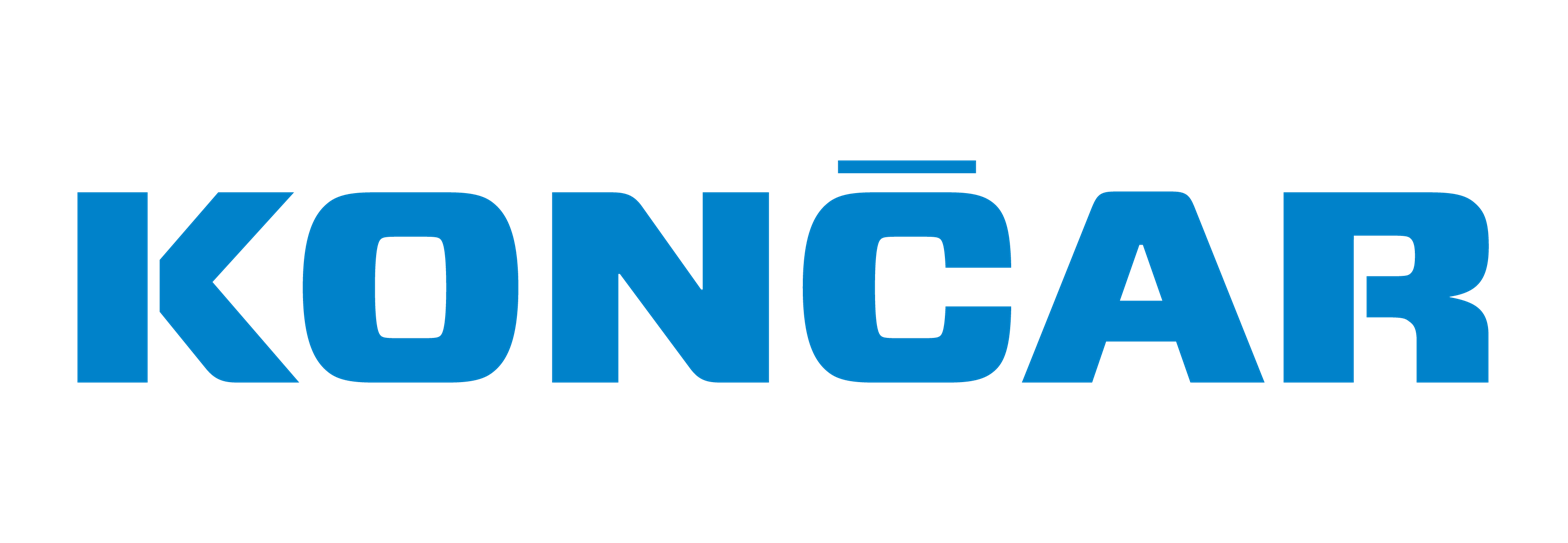
- Type: Public
- Traded as: ZSE: KOEI
- ISIN: HRKOEIRA0009
- Industry: Energy, Electrical traction, IT, Household appliances
- Founded: 1921; 105 years ago
- Headquarters: Zagreb, Croatia
- Area served: Worldwide
- Key people: Gordan Kolak (CEO)
- Products: drive and energy technology, mobility and construction solutions, catering equipment, industrial electronics
- Services: Maintenance and overhaul
- Revenue: €1.319,6 billion (2025)
- Net income: €220.7 million (2025)
- Total assets: €590.25 million (2021)
- Total equity: €100.78 million (2017)
- Owner: Hrvatska poštanska banka (28.17%); Addiko Bank (16.37%); Société Générale (14.67%); Splitska banka (13.97%); Centar za restrukturiranje i prodaju (3.25%); Others (as of 31 December 2017)
- Number of employees: 6,345 (2025)
- Divisions: KONČAR - Power Plant and Electric Traction Engineering Inc. KONČAR - Elektronics and Informatics Inc. KONČAR - Institute for Electrical Engineering Inc. KONČAR - Power Transformers Ltd. KONČAR - Distribution and Special Transformers Inc. KONČAR - Electric Vehicles Inc. KONČAR - Power Plant and Electric Traction Engineering Inc. KONČAR - Household Appliances Ltd. KONCAR – Catering Equipment Inc.
- Website: koncar.hr

KONČAR – Elektroindustrija d.d. is a Croatian electrical, transport and energy company based in the Trešnjevka neighborhood of Zagreb, Croatia.

Listed on the Zagreb Stock Exchange being constituent of CROBEX, the company consists of 16 subsidiary companies (as of 2017), employing a staff of 5,271. Annual sales account for 901 million euros, of which 73% are exports. During recent years, KONČAR has delivered its products and plants to more than 100 countries across all continents.

KONČAR dates from 1921, when a modest but at the time highly significant manufacture of electrical motors commenced in Zagreb. The company is named after World War II resistance fighter Rade Končar.

== History ==
The company was founded by two engineers in 1919, formally registered on 24 January 1921 under the name of 'Elektra'. It became a subsidiary of Siemens shortly after that same year. Following World War II, it was nationalised and renamed after Rade Končar, a communist resistance fighter, then finally shortened to Končar in 1991. Notable milestones for the company include the production and delivery of the first electric motor using a varnished wire in 1930, and in 1948 it produced its first generator.

Since then it produced over 400 thousand transformers, 700 generators and delivered around 200 units of rolling stock.

== Divisions ==
=== KONČAR – Electrical Engineering Institute ===
An accredited institute which develops solutions for transformers, rotational machines, sensors, high voltage equipment and railway components and systems.

This includes the development, testing and production of electronics, including displays, for the control and monitoring of railway vehicles, transformers and rotational machines, including laboratory equipment.

=== KONČAR – Electronics and Informatics (INEM) ===
Develops and produces traction systems, such as inverters for trains, coaches and trams. It produces electronic equipment for the energy sector, as well as various ICT solutions for industrial use.

=== KONČAR – Engineering ===
Founded in 1991, it offers engineering services in construction, energy and railway infrastructure. It produces wind turbines.

=== KONČAR – Generators and Motors ===
The division develops and produces large generators for power plants, electric motors for low-floor trams, EMUs, ships, compressor hubs and various other industrial uses.

=== KONČAR – Electric Vehicles ===
Produces low-floor trams, electric multiple units and moving bases since 1970.

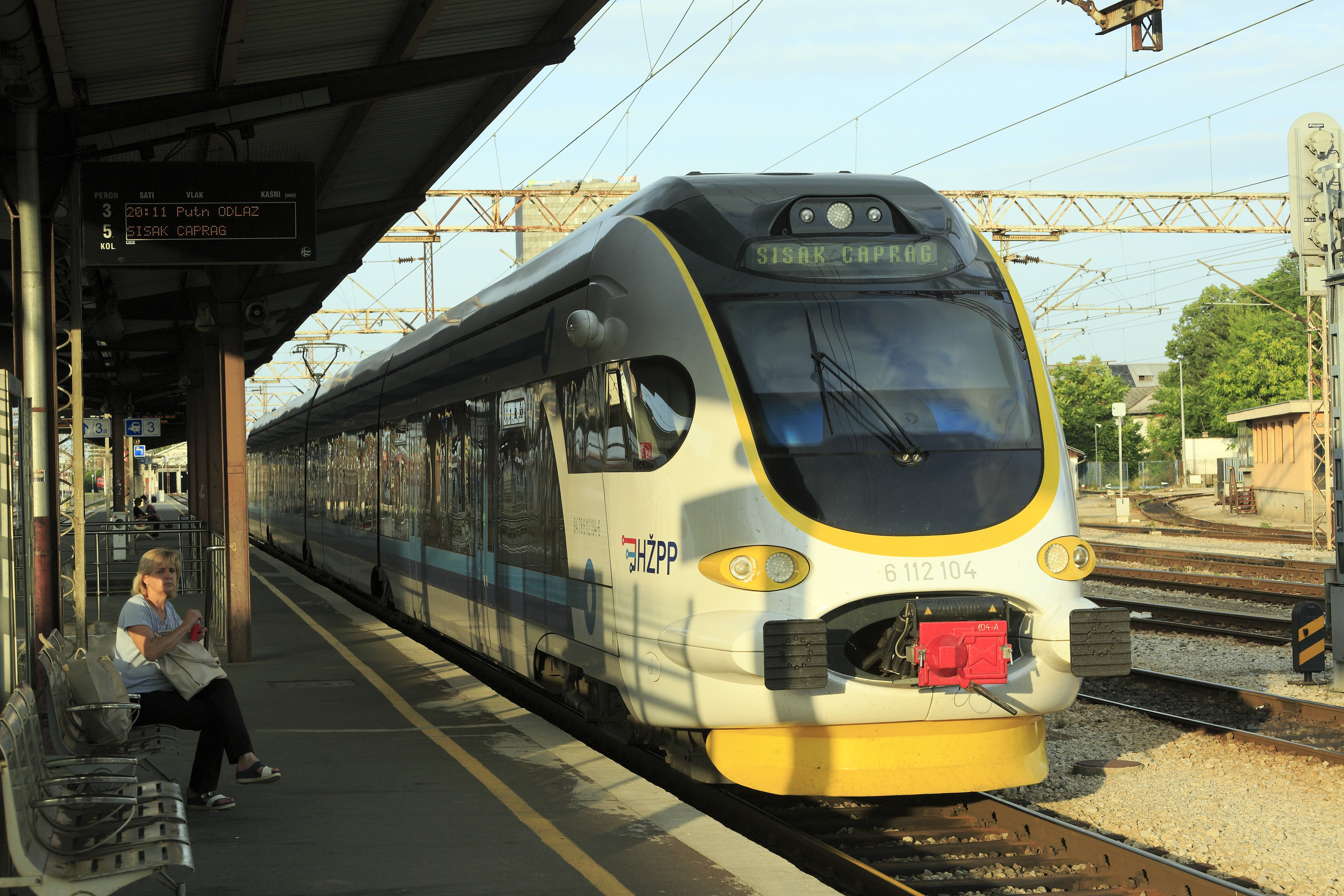
Croatian Railways new EMU vehicles

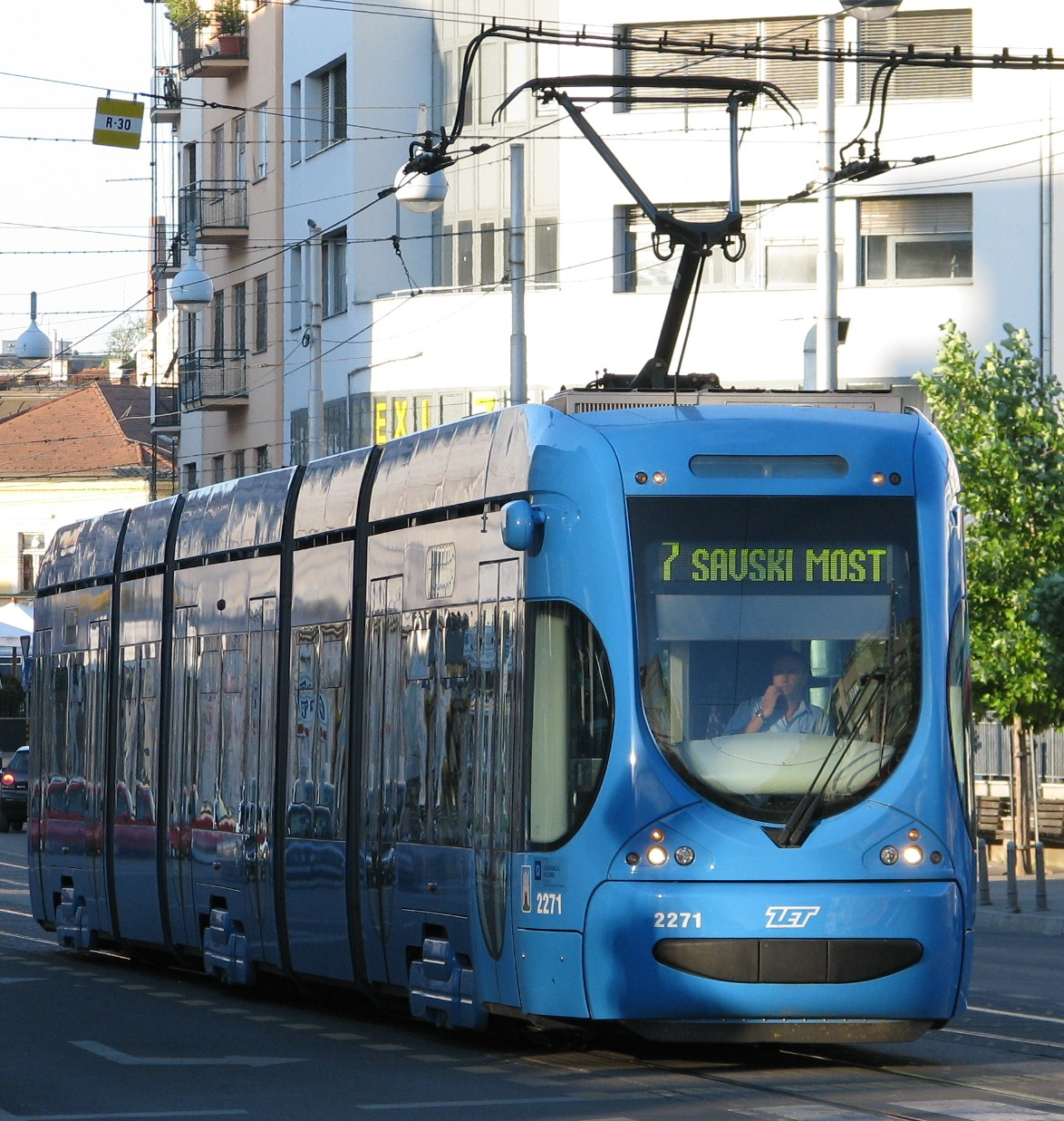
Modern low-floor articulated TMK 2200 tram

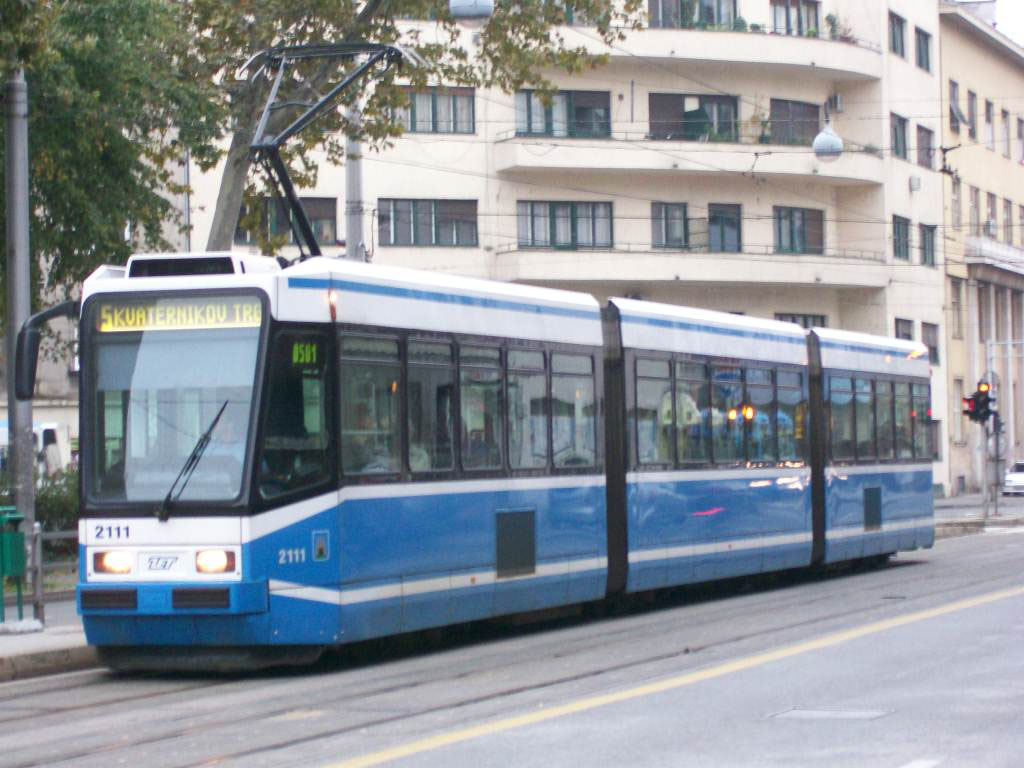
Older TMK 2100 tram operating in Zagreb

=== KONČAR – D&ST ===
Develops and produces power transformers.

=== KONČAR – Metal Construction ===
Produces various metal components such as vehicle bogies, vacuum furnaces, transformer tanks, busbars and individual components for generators.

=== KONČAR – Switchgear ===
The division manufactures electrical equipment for transmission and distribution of electricity. The production capacities are located at two locations.

=== KONČAR – Instrument Transformers ===
Develops and produces medium voltage instrument transformers.

=== KONČAR – Motors and Electrical Systems ===
Low voltage motors and fans.

=== KONČAR – Catering Equipment ===
KONCAR - Catering Equipment inc
- UGOSTITELJSKA OPREMA
- Type: Limited liability company
- ISIN: HRKOEIRA0009
- Industry: Professional catering equipment
- Founded: 1946
- Headquarters: Zagreb, Croatia
- Key people: Željko Tukec
- Services: Design, manufacture, installation and servicing of professional catering equipment
- Owner: Končar Elektroindustrija d.d.
- Parent: KONČAR Group
- Website: www.koncar-ugo.hr

KONČAR — Catering Equipment Ltd. is an industrial company that operates within the KONČAR Group. The company was founded in 1946 and specializes in the design, manufacture, installation and servicing of professional catering equipment.

Since 1994, Končar has been working with Siemens as part of the Končar Power Transformers (KPT) joint venture, manufacturing power transformers at the Zagreb plant.

=== KONČAR Home Appliances ===
Producer of home appliances, sold to Lovato Electrics in 2019, together with Low-Voltage Switches.

== Products ==
- Railway
  - Locomotives
    - HŽ series 1141
    - HŽ series 1142
  - Multiple-units
    - HŽ series 6012 (battery)
    - HŽ series 6112 (diesel)
    - HŽ series 6211 (battery electric)
    - HŽ series 7022 (electric)
  - Tram and light rail
    - TMK 2100
    - TMK 2200
    - TMK 2300
    - TMK 2400

== See also ==
- Industry of Croatia
- Nuclear energy in Croatia
