= Herbrand =

Herbrand is a surname. Notable people with the surname include:

- Freddy Herbrand (born 1944), Belgian decathlete
- Jacques Herbrand (1908–1931), French mathematician
- Markus Herbrand (born 1971), German politician
