= List of political scandals in Croatia =

Politics of Croatia

This article provides a list of political scandals in Croatia:

== 1990s ==
=== Ankica Lepej affair (1998) ===
In 1998, Ankica Lepej learned that Ankica Tuđman, wife of the first president of Croatia, deposited 210,000 German marks and 15,740 US dollars into an unreported bank account. Following the publication of the information (which Lepej had anonymously provided) in Jutarnji list, Lepej became regarded as the first prominent whistleblower in modern Croatian history. Zagebačka banka then published an advert in Jutarnji list offering a million kuna reward for information on who leaked the data. Lepej presented herself to the bank with a lawyer and, subsequently, was fired by the bank (with only 11 months left to retirement) and arrested. The charges were eventually dropped, after Franjo Tuđman's death. There was public outcry, with both petition signing (co-organized by Vlado Gotovac) and media votes (TV talk-show Latinica), as reported by TV show Labirint.

== 2000s ==
=== Fimi Media scandal (2007) ===
The Fimi Media scandal is one of the most significant corruption cases in Croatia's political history. The scandal revolves around the misuse of state funds and illegal financing of the Croatian Democratic Union (HDZ) party. The Fimi Media marketing agency played a central role in funneling money into the HDZ's slush funds.

Former Prime Minister Ivo Sanader was at the heart of the scandal. He and his co-defendants were charged with siphoning around 70 million kuna (€9.3 million) from state-owned companies and institutions through Fimi Media into the HDZ's illicit funds between 2004 and 2009. Sanader was found guilty in multiple corruption cases related to Fimi Media, along with other scandals like the Planinska and Ina - MOL cases. HDZ was fined 3.5 million kuna (roughly €460,000) and ordered to return around 14 million kuna.

=== INA-MOL scandal (2008) ===
The scandal involved allegations of bribery related to the management rights of INA, a major Croatian oil company, being handed over to MOL, a Hungarian oil company. Former Prime Minister Ivo Sanader was accused and subsequently convicted of accepting a bribe from MOL's head Zsolt Hernadi. Sanader was sentenced to six years in prison for this crime. The court found that Sanader and Hernadi had agreed that, in exchange for a €10 million bribe, they would ensure changes to agreements concerning the Croatian oil company INA, granting MOL controlling influence.

== 2010s ==
=== Consultancy Affair (2013) ===
Tomislav Karamarko, who was the Deputy Prime Minister of Croatia and the leader of the Croatian Democratic Union (HDZ), resigned due to a scandal involving a conflict of interest. An ethics commission ruled that there was a conflict because of his connections to a lobbyist for the Hungarian oil company MOL, which was in dispute with the Croatian government over the control of INA, a Croatian firm1. This led to a vote of no-confidence and raised the prospect of early elections.

It was revealed that his wife had business dealings with Josip Petrović, a lobbyist for MOL, the Hungarian oil company involved in a dispute with the Croatian government over the management of INA, Croatia's national oil company. Critics argued that this presented a conflict of interest, given Karamarko's governmental position and Croatia's ongoing arbitration proceedings with MOL.

=== Software Affair (2017) ===
The Software Affair involved former Croatian Minister Gabrijela Žalac from the Croatian Democratic Union (HDZ) party. It centered around the procurement of a software program worth 16.2 million kuna (approximately €2.1 million) awarded to a company called Ampelos by the Ministry of Regional Development and EU Funds during her tenure. The company, based in Podstrana near Split, was reportedly led by individuals who were close associates of Žalac, and it was the sole bidder in the tender published in 2018.

Žalac, along with the head of the state's finance and contracting agency SAFU, Tomislav Petric, and two other persons, were arrested in an ongoing corruption investigation by the European Public Prosecutor's Office (EPPO) in Croatia. The investigation related to the public procurement of this information system and the alleged crimes committed in the ministry and SAFU.

Furthermore, a Zagreb County Court indictment panel rejected the application by Žalac's defense counsel to exclude text messages she had exchanged with former state secretary Josipa Rimac from evidence in the case. These messages were related to the mismanagement of European funds for software procurement. The EPPO charged Žalac and others with defrauding the EU and Croatian budgets of more than €1.3 million. Žalac faced charges of abuse of position and authority and of influence peddling, among other accusations.

=== Brothel Scandal (2019) ===
Toni Turčinov, the mayor of the Murter-Kornati municipality in Croatia, spent €1,560 from the municipality's budget at the Austrian brothel called La Cocotte. He used the official card of the Municipality of Murter-Kornati for this purpose. The Office for the Suppression of Corruption and Organized Crime (USKOK) initiated an investigation into Turčinov's actions.

== 2020s ==
=== "Skipping the Line" Affair (2020) ===
Slavko Linić, a former Croatian minister from Social Democratic Party of Croatia (SDP), became the center of controversy when he acknowledged receiving the COVID-19 vaccine ahead of his designated priority group. Similarly, Marko Primorac from Croatian Democratic Union (HDZ), the current Croatian Minister of Finance, along with his wife, Iskra Primorac, a high-ranking state official, admitted to receiving COVID-19 vaccinations ahead of their scheduled turns.

=== The “Secret Club” Scandal (2020) ===
In 2020, a scandal known as the "secret club" rocked Croatia's political and business scene. It involved a clandestine gathering in the Croatian capital where the elite flouted lockdown rules, escorts were brought in from Serbia, and vintage wine and whiskey flowed. Bribes allegedly changed hands during these gatherings.

The incident began with the arrest of Dragan Kovačević, the chief executive of Jadranski naftovod - JANAF (Adriatic Oil Pipeline Operator), under allegations of influence trading and accepting bribes. Kovačević, who had shifted allegiance from the Social Democratic Party (SDP) to the pro-business Croatian People's Party (HNS) after an unsuccessful presidential campaign, was appointed to lead JANAF following the victory of an SDP-HNS coalition in the 2011 parliamentary elections.

One of the visitors was Jakov Kitarović, husband of former President Kolinda Grabar-Kitarović from HDZ, who frequented the club while she was still in office. Later it became known that her successor, incumbent President Zoran Milanović from SDP, also visited the club on several occasions. President Milanović defended himself by saying that he came there to eat leftover food.

=== Wine Envelope Affair (2020) ===
Tomislav Tolušić, a former Croatian Minister of Agriculture and a member of the HDZ party, is under investigation by both European and domestic authorities for alleged financial misconduct involving EU funds and national subsidies related to the "Wine Envelope" program. Arrested in May 2022 by the European Public Prosecutor's Office (EPPO), Tolušić is accused of illegally obtaining EU funds for his winery, totaling over 2.5 million kunas ($375,000) through regulations he himself enacted while in office. Additionally, he's facing charges for misrepresenting assets to secure further EU grants. Tolušić has defended his actions by citing a positive review from the Commission for Deciding on Conflicts of Interest, allowing his participation in the subsidy tender.

=== Bribe for Mayor (2021) ===
Director of Croatia's public broadcasting company Croatian Radiotelevision (HRT) carried 50 thousand euros to Milan Bandić, mayor of Croatian capital Zagreb, on behalf of a friend to arrange permits, claims Croatian Bureau for Combating Corruption and Organized Crime USKOK.

=== Stealing from construction site (2022) ===
Stjepan Turković, a prominent member of the HDZ party, was caught stealing iron reinforcement from a construction site along with his son. The incident took place at the road construction site in Karlovac. Turković, who has held numerous party duties over the past 30 years, was serving as an advisor to the director of the County Road Administration at the time. The theft was documented in photographs.

Road Administration made the decision not to fire him, with the explanation that he was stealing outside working hours.
