= Ankica =

Ankica is a feminine given name of South Slavic origin. It is a diminutive form of the name Anka.

== List of people with the given name ==
- Ankica Gudeljević (born 1964), Bosnian Croat diplomat and politician
- Ankica Lepej (1948–2022), Croatian whistleblower
- Ankica Tuđman (1926–2022), Croatian First Lady
- Ankica Zmaić (born 1969), Croatian politician

== See also ==
- Ankita
