= Corruption in Croatia =

Corruption in Croatia describes the prevention and occurrence of corruption in Croatia. Since the 2020s, Croatia has made steady progress in anti-corruption efforts with enduring political corruption a perpetual focal point in public affairs.

Through its accession to the European Union in 2013, Croatia undertook various measures to combat corruption. The legal and institutional framework, as well as government agencies, are addressing the issue of corruption in a much larger scale, and the inter-agency cooperation for corruption prevention increased, but these efforts are facing the large obstacle of an inefficient and corrupt judicial system. A specialized anti-corruption agency, USKOK, prosecuted 2,185 individuals from 2006 to 2012 and achieved a 95% conviction rate, including former Prime Minister Ivo Sanader.

== Indicators of corruption ==
=== Global Corruption Barometer-EU ===
Transparency International's Global Corruption Barometer-EU periodically surveys ordinary citizens of European Union countries about their experiences with corruption during the preceding year. The most recent (as of 2026) survey was conducted from October to December of 2020 and published in 2021. The following tables summarize how Croatian survey respondents reported, compared to all EU respondents.

Respondents expressing agreement to Agree/Disagree/Don´t know questions (%)
Question	Croatian	EU
Corruption increased in the past year	41	32
Government corruption is a big problem	92	62
Government is doing well in tackling corruption	26	43
Government is doing badly in tackling corruption	72	49
Citizen opinions are a factor in government decisions	14	30
A few special interests run government for their own benefit	66	53

Respondents' experiences of corrupt activities (%)
Experience of corruption	Croatian	EU
Paid a bribe to get a public service	14	7
Used personal connections to get a public service	36	33
Had sex extorted from them, or knew someone who had	13	7
Feared reprisal if they reported corruption	72	45

=== Corruption Perceptions Index ===
Transparency International's 2025 Corruption Perceptions Index scored the country at 47 on a scale from 0 ("highly corrupt") to 100 ("very clean"). When ranked by score, Croatia ranked 63rd among the 182 countries in the Index, where the country ranked first is perceived to have the most honest public sector. For comparison with regional scores, the best score among Western European and European Union countries (Note: Austria, Belgium, Bulgaria, Croatia, Cyprus, Czechia, Denmark, Estonia, Finland, France, Germany, Greece, Hungary, Iceland, Ireland, Italy, Latvia, Lithuania, Luxembourg, Malta, Netherlands, Norway, Poland, Portugal, Romania, Slovakia, Slovenia, Spain, Sweden, Switzerland, and the United Kingdom.) was 89, the average score was 64 and the worst score was 40. For comparison with worldwide scores, the best score was 89 (ranked 1), the average score was 42, and the worst score was 9 (ranked 181, in a two-way tie). Since the current version of the Corruption Perceptions Index was introduced in 2012, Croatia's score has fluctuated: its lowest score was 46 in 2012 and its highest scores were 51 in 2015 and 50 in 2022 and 2023.

=== Anti‑Corruption and Integrity Outlook ===
The Anti‑Corruption and Integrity Outlook analysis carried out in 2026 by the OECD on Croatia found that Croatia exceeded the OECD average for integrity on political financing, conflicts of interest, freedom of information, lobbying, judicial transparency, prosecutorial transparency, and civil service accountability.

== See also ==
- Police corruption in Croatia
- Privatization in Croatia
- Ankica Lepej – first prominent whistleblower case
- List of political scandals in Croatia
