= Ankica Tuđman =

First Lady of Croatia (1926–2022)

First Lady of Croatia
- In role 22 December 1990 – 10 December 1999
- President: Franjo Tuđman
- Preceded by: Herself (as Spouse of the President of the Presidency of the Republic of Croatia)
- Succeeded by: Neda Pavletić (Acting); Milka Mesić

Spouse of the President of the Presidency of the Republic of Croatia
- In role 25 July 1990 – 22 December 1990
- President: Franjo Tuđman
- Prime Minister: Stjepan Mesić; Josip Manolić
- Preceded by: Herself (as Spouse of the President of the Presidency of SR Croatia)
- Succeeded by: Herself (as Spouse of the President of the Republic of Croatia)

Spouse of the President of the Presidency of SR Croatia
- In role 30 May 1990 – 25 July 1990
- President: Franjo Tuđman
- Prime Minister: Stjepan Mesić
- Preceded by: Milena Latin
- Succeeded by: Herself (as Spouse of the President of the Presidency of the Republic of Croatia)

Personal details
- Born: Ankica Žumbar; 24 July 1926 Zagreb, Kingdom of Serbs, Croats and Slovenes
- Died: 6 October 2022 (aged 96) Zagreb, Croatia
- Spouse: Franjo Tuđman (m. 1945; died 1999)
- Children: 3, including Miroslav

Ankica Tuđman (née Žumbar; 24 July 1926 – 6 October 2022) was the wife of Franjo Tuđman, the first President of an independent Croatia from 1991 until 1999, following the country's secession from SFR Yugoslavia, and the last President of the Presidency of SR Croatia as a constituent Yugoslav republic.

She was the mother of the now-deceased Member of the Croatian Parliament and presidential candidate Miroslav Tuđman.

== Early years ==
Ankica Žumbar was born in Zagreb on 24 July 1926. She finished primary school in Zagreb and attended hospitality school until she abandoned her studies to join the Partisans in May 1944.

At age 18, she met her future husband, Franjo Tuđman, in Čazma where he was in charge of a department of the 10th Zagreb Corps of the Yugoslav Partisans. In January 1945, she transferred from Čazma to the Supreme command in Belgrade, returning to Zagreb following its liberation by Partisan forces in May 1945. Thereafter, she moved to Belgrade with Tuđman, gaining employment at the Ministry of Foreign Affairs of SFR Yugoslavia and marrying Tuđman on 25 May 1945. They had two sons and one daughter, namely Miroslav (1946–2021), Stjepan (born in 1948), and Nevenka (born in 1951).

In 1954, she passed the high school leaving exam and enrolled at the University of Belgrade to study English. However, she abandoned her college studies in her sophomore year, choosing to take a course in English at the Yugoslav foreign ministry. In 1960, her husband was promoted to the rank of major general, but decided to leave the military in 1961, with the whole family moving back to Zagreb. Once there Franjo Tuđman established the Institute for the History of the Labour Movement in Croatia and its first director. However, he was removed from that position in 1967 and forced to abandon his membership in the League of Communists of Yugoslavia. In 1972 and 1981, Franjo Tuđman was sentenced to prison.

== First Lady of Croatia ==
In the 1990 parliamentary election, the first multi-party elections in Croatia in over 50 years, the Croatian Democratic Union party led by her husband gained a large majority in the Sabor and he was elected the President of the Presidency of SR Croatia on 30 May 1990, succeeding Ivo Latin. On 25 July 1990, the collective presidency was abolished and the office of President of Croatia was introduced. On 22 December, the Croatian Parliament officially adopted a new constitution and the following year a series of further political changes led to the gradual independence of Croatia from SFR Yugoslavia. A referendum was held in May 1991 in which 93,2% of voters expressed their preference for Croatia to secede from the Yugoslav federation. This occurred on 25 June 1991, when the Parliament adopted the "Constitutional decision on sovereignty and independence of the Republic of Croatia."

On 7 October 1991, her husband escaped an assassination attempt by the Yugoslav Air Force, which also targeted then-President of the Presidency of Yugoslavia Stjepan Mesić and Prime Minister of Yugoslavia Ante Marković. As a result, on 8 October 1991, at a secret meeting in the basement of the INA building in Šubićeva Street, all remaining legal ties with Yugoslavia were severed by Parliament. The Croatian War of Independence lasted from 1991 until 1995 and Ankica founded the Humanitarian Foundation for the Children of Croatia, non-profit NGO and humanitarian organization aimed at aiding the children of participants in the war and children from poorer families.

== Later years ==
Following the death of her husband on December 10, 1999, she and her family were often publicly criticized, especially by Tuđman's successor in the post of president, Stjepan Mesić. Ankica, a member of the HDZ since its foundation in June 1989, was also expelled from the party's membership under Tuđman's more liberal and pro-West orientated successor as party chairman, Ivo Sanader, who served two terms as Prime Minister of Croatia from 2003 until his resignation in 2009. However, she returned to the party under Tomislav Karamarko in 2012, receiving the membership card number 002. In 2006, she published a book titled My Life with Francek (a diminutive of the name Franjo).

Ankica Lepej, a bank clerk in the main office of Zagrebačka banka, learned in 1998 that Ankica Tuđman deposited 210,000 German marks and 15,740 US dollars into an unreported bank account. Lepej became the first prominent whistleblower in modern Croatian history, but got fired from the bank just 11 months before retirement and arrested as a result of exposing this account. Lepej and her husband, also a victim of corrupt privatization in Croatia, were forced to sell their apartment in order to survive. Ankica Tuđman brought charges against Lepej for revealing an "official secret", but these charges were dropped after Franjo Tuđman's death. Smiljko Sokol, president of the Constitutional Court of Croatia, ruled out that "money is not an asset".

== Personal life and death ==
Tuđman was married to Franjo Tuđman from 1945 until his death in the post of President of Croatia on 10 December 1999. Together they had three children: Miroslav, Stjepan, and Nevenka. Ankica had seven grandchildren: Nina and Ivana are Miroslav's children, Siniša and Dejan are Nevenka's children, and Anamarija, Nera, and Anton Franjo are Stjepan's children.

Tuđman died on 6 October 2022, at the age of 96.
