= Ankica Lepej =

Croatian whistleblower (1948–2022)

Ankica Anita Lepej (1948 – 18 January 2022) was a Croatian bank clerk who uncovered a secret bank account and funds of the wife of the Croatian president Franjo Tuđman, thus becoming the first prominent whistleblower in modern Croatian history.

== Biography ==
Lepej was born in the People's Republic of Croatia, Federal People's Republic of Yugoslavia, in 1948.

She lived a modest family life in Zagreb and was working as a bank clerk in main office of Zagrebačka banka in Ban Jelačić square in Zagreb.

In 1998, she learned that Ankica Tuđman, wife of the first president of Croatia, deposited 210,000 German marks and 15,740 US dollars into an unreported bank account. Bank offered a million-kuna reward in Jutarnji list for any info on the whistleblower. Lepej presented herself with a lawyer and, subsequently, got fired by the bank (with only 11 months left to retirement) and arrested. The charges were eventually dropped, after Franjo Tuđman's death. Public outcry was huge, with both petition signing (co-organized by Vlado Gotovac) and media votes (TV talk-show Latinica), as reported by TV show Labirint.

Her husband was also an earlier victim of corrupt privatization and the family was forced to sell their apartment to survive. The city of Zagreb later provided them with modest accommodation in public housing in 2006.

She wrote the book Istina – Savjest iznad bankarske tajne (Truth – Conscience Above Banking Secrecy) describing her experience.

Parliamentary speech about Ankica Lepej by Urša Raukar-Gamulin

Lepej had long-term health complications related to cancer. She died from COVID-19 complications in Zagreb on 18 January 2022, during the COVID-19 pandemic in Croatia.

== Recognition ==
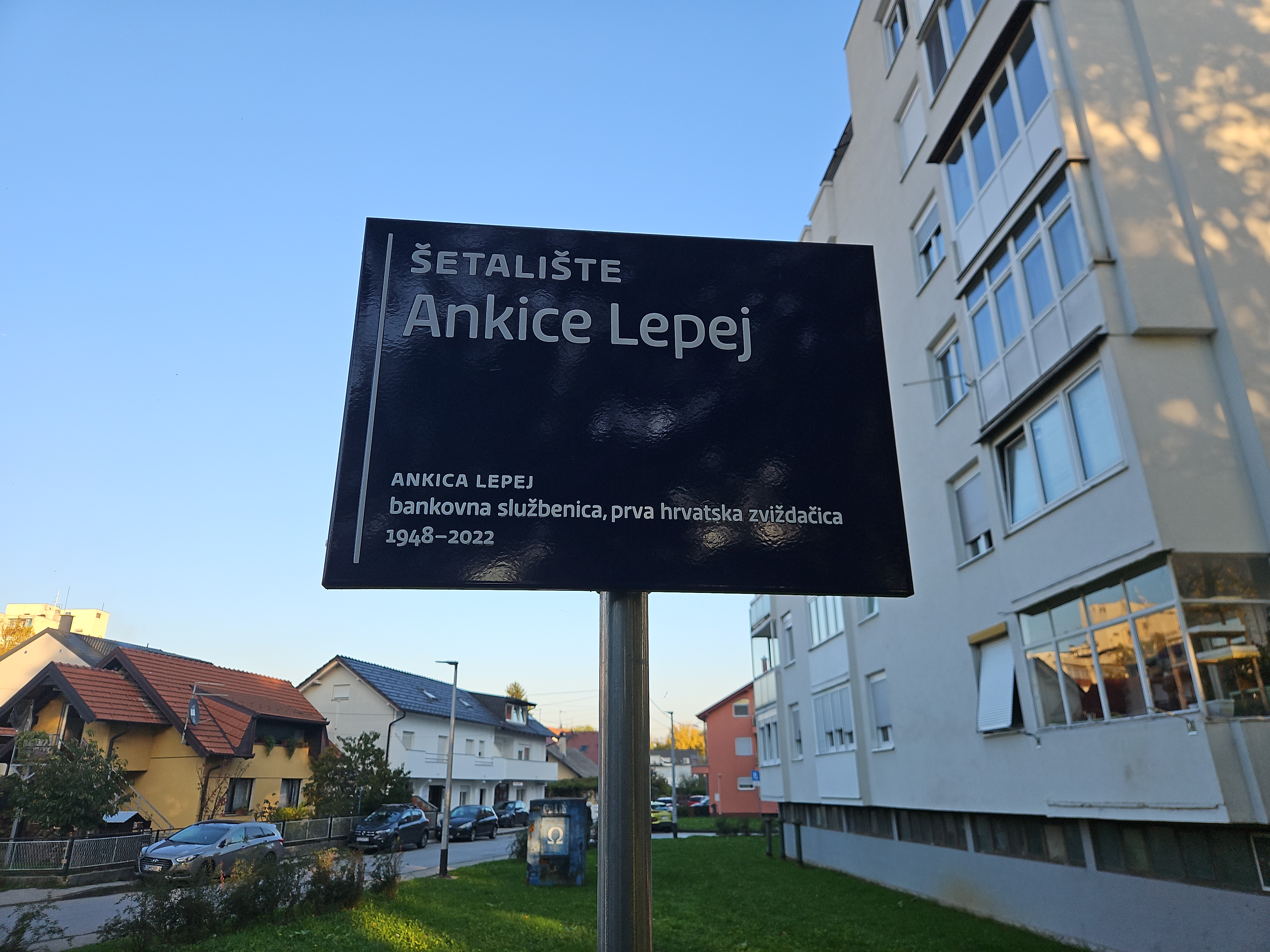
Ankice Lepej promenade plate

Prominent public figures praised her work, sacrifice and commitment, including the parliamentarian Urša Raukar Gamulin who gave a short speech dedicated to Lepej in the Croatian Parliament.

The city of Zagreb made a decision to name a street after Ankica Lepej. Promenade of Ankica Lepej (Croatian: Šetalište Ankice Lepej) is located in Zagreb's Gajnice, at the intersection of streets Čileanska and Kerestinečki žrtava. The decision was made by the Parliamentary Committee for Naming Settlements, Streets and Squares headed by Rada Borić, that is, the Assembly of the City of Zagreb. Ankica Lepej worked in the local branch of Zagrebačka banka, and lived nearby for most of her life.
