= City Savings Bank of Zagreb =

Former bank based in Zagreb

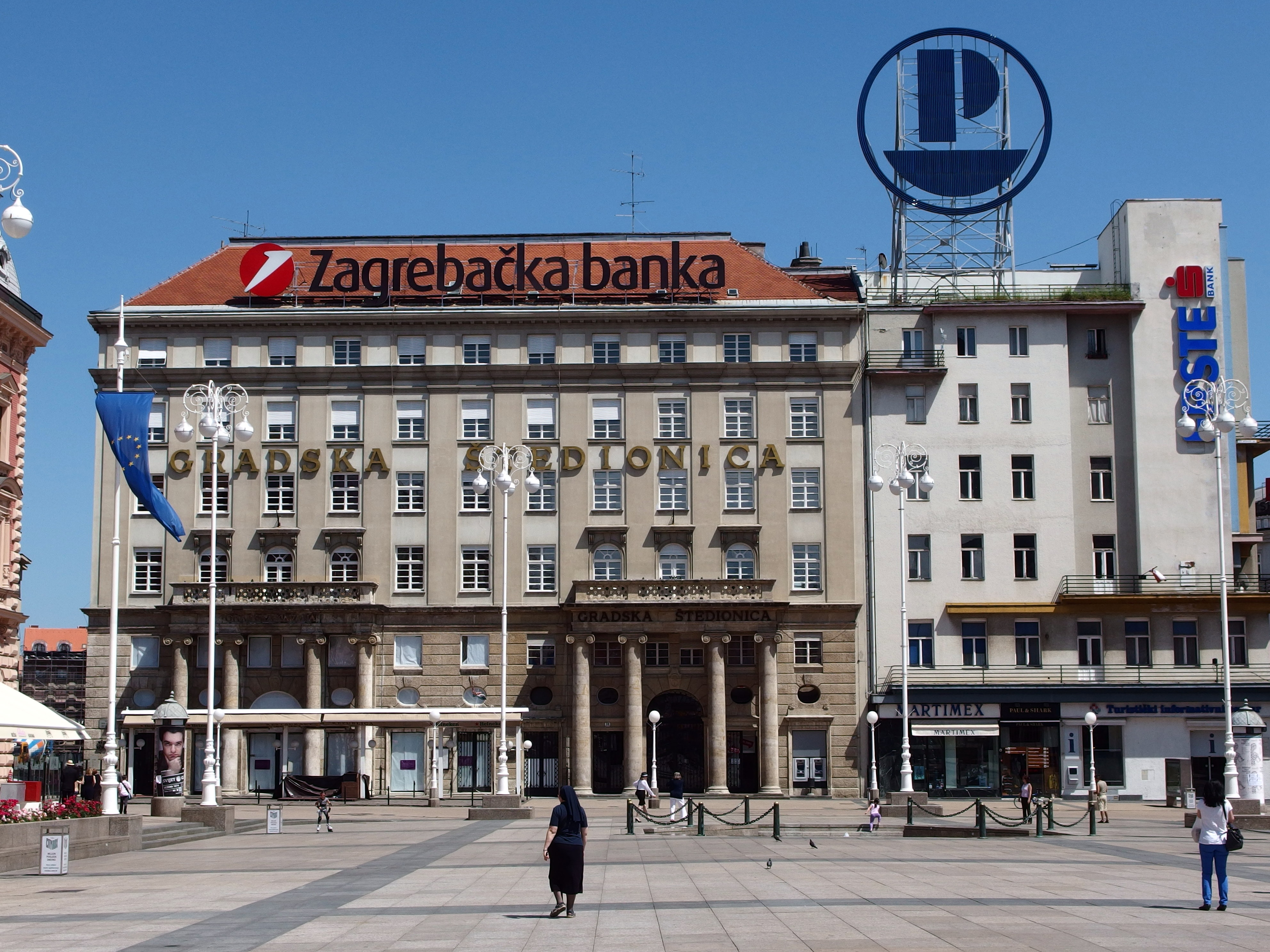
Former head office of the City Savings Bank on Ban Jelačić Square in Zagreb, designed by Ignjat Fischer and completed in 1925

The City Savings Bank (Croatian: Gradska štedionica) was a significant bank headquartered in Zagreb, created in 1913, reorganized after World War II and eventually merged into the National Bank of Yugoslavia in 1952.

== History ==
The Zagreb City Assembly approved the Statute of the City Savings Bank in Zagreb on 10 February 1913. At a time, Zagreb had a population of 100,000 and was rapidly developing into a modern city. The bank's primary role was financing the city's public companies. In 1916, the bank acquired the Zagreb electric tram company (ZET) and invested heavily in the development of the tram network and public transport in general.

The bank fared comparatively better during the European banking crisis of 1931 than many of its competitors. It had to request a moratorium on its liabilities, but this was lifted in 1935, earlier than for peers including the larger First Croatian Savings Bank which had entered moratorium in April 1932. The City Savings Bank benefited in this from its backing by the municipality of Zagreb.

It was reorganized in 1946-1947 as a so-called Komunalna Banka, with the task of servicing local budgets and controlling plan fulfillment by local enterprises. Like all other such entities, it was merged into the National Bank of Yugoslavia in 1952 under the era's "monobank" system, which was however dismantled later in the same decade.

== Legacy ==
The Zagrebačka banka (Bank of Zagreb) was formed in 1977 by amalgamating various assets and operations including some from the City Savings Bank such as its former head office on Ban Jelačić Square, and views itself as the continuing entity of the City Savings Bank.

== See also ==
- First Croatian Savings Bank
- Ljubljana Credit Bank
- State Mortgage Bank of Yugoslavia
- List of banks in Croatia
- List of banks in Yugoslavia
