= Zagrebačka Banka =

Bank in Croatia

Zagrebačka banka d.d.

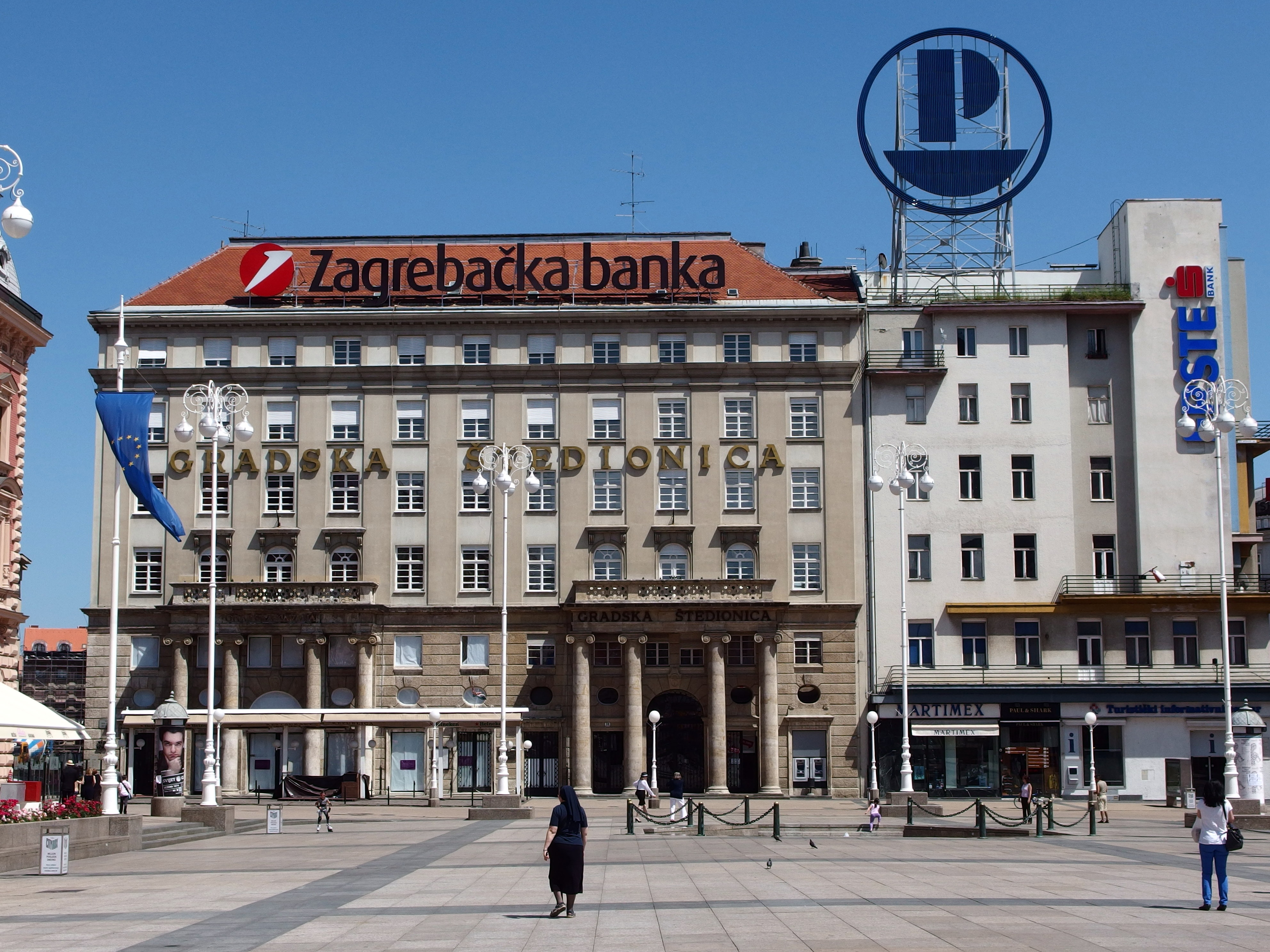
- Head office on Ban Jelačić Square, former seat of the City Savings Bank of Zagreb
- Type: Public
- Traded as: ZSE: ZABA
- ISIN: HRZABARA0009
- Industry: banking, financial services
- Predecessor: City Savings Bank of Zagreb
- Founded: 1977 in Zagreb
- Headquarters: Trg bana Josipa Jelačića 10, Croatia
- Area served: Croatia, Federation of Bosnia and Herzegovina (UniCredit Bank d.d. Mostar)
- Key people: Dalibor Ćubela (CEO), Lorenzo Ramajola, Marco Lotteri, Slaven Rukavina, Spas Vidarkinsky
- Services: banking services, investment banking, corporate banking, banking for natural persons, asset management
- Total assets: €23.144 billion
- Total equity: €2.272 billion (Q3 2025)
- Number of employees: 4,200 (2020)
- Parent: UniCredit
- Website: Croatia : www.zaba.hr FBiH : www.unicredit.ba

Zagrebačka Banka, also known as ZABA, is the largest bank in Croatia, owned by Milan-based UniCredit.

== Overview ==
The Zagreb Municipal Bank, later renamed as Credit Bank, was formed in the 1960s, partly from assets and operations from what had been the City Savings Bank of Zagreb until its fusion into Yugoslavia's monobank system in the late 1940s. In the early 1970s, it was affiliated with the United Bank of Croatia, the newly formed Croatian component of a Yugoslavia-wide network of nine so-called associated banks. Zagrebačka Banka was the first Yugoslav bank to be reorganized as a joint-stock company in 1989.

In 1995, Zagrebačka Banka was listed at the Zagreb Stock Exchange, the first Croatian bank doing so. In March 2002, it was acquired by the UniCredit Group of Italy. By December 2005, Zagrebačka Banka's market share (by total assets) in Croatia reached 24.33 percent, making it the country's largest bank ahead of Privredna Banka Zagreb.

By 2009, that market share had grown slightly to 25 percent, and the bank's services were used by 80,000 businesses and 1.1 million citizens. It was one of 24 companies included in the CROBEX share index.

== Controversies ==
Zagrebačka Banka was an employer to Ankica Lepej (1948 – 2022) the first prominent whistleblower in modern Croatian history, who uncovered a secret bank account and funds of the wife of the Croatian president Franjo Tuđman. Bank originally offered a million-kuna reward in Jutarnji list for any info on the whistleblower. Lepej presented herself with a lawyer and, subsequently, got fired by the bank (with only 11 months left to retirement) and arrested. The charges were eventually dropped, after Franjo Tuđman's death.

== See also ==
- Privredna banka Zagreb
- List of banks in Yugoslavia
- List of banks in Croatia
