= Privatization in Croatia =

Privatization in Croatia refers to political and economic reforms which include the privatization of state-owned assets in Croatia. Initially prominent during the late-1980s, most privatization took place during the 1990s as Croatia declared independence from Yugoslavia. These periods were overseen by Yugoslav Prime Minister Ante Marković and Croatian President Franjo Tuđman as well his political party, the Croatian Democratic Union (HDZ). Privatization in Croatia has been controversial due to the adverse economic impact of their related War of Independence (1991–1995) had on the distribution of state-owned assets.

== 20th century ==
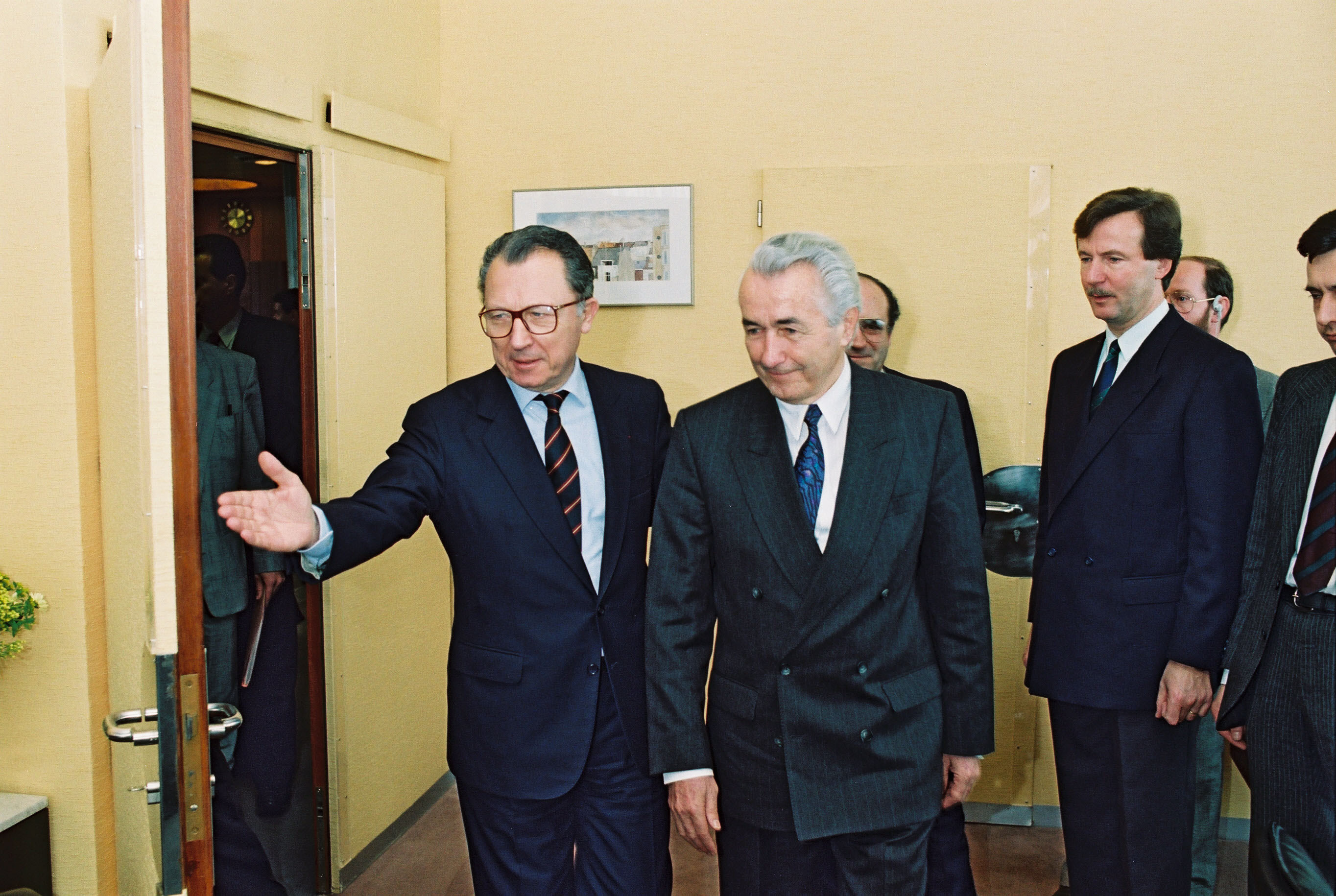
Yugoslav Prime Minister Ante Marković (second from left) in 1990

The privatization process in the former Yugoslavia was initiated during the government of Yugoslav Prime Minister Ante Marković. In 1990 he introduced a privatization program, with newly passed federal laws on privatization allowing company management boards to initiate privatization, mainly through internal share-holding schemes, initially not tradeable in the stock exchange. This meant that the law put an emphasis on "insider" privatization to company workers and managers, to whom the shares could be offered at a discount. Yugoslav authorities used the term "property transformation" when referring to the process of transforming public ownership into private hands.

Separate privatization laws in individual republics replaced the federal law during the mid-1990s. The Croatian government replaced the federal law on privatization with its own privatization law in April 1991. The new law stipulated compulsory privatization and the elimination of public ownership, while publicly owned enterprises were to be transformed into joint-stock or limited liability companies. These new laws in Croatia and Slovenia were interpreted as tacit nationalization, a tendency of both governments to first re-nationalize public property in order to later proceed with privatization. At the time Croatia gained independence, its economy, as well as the whole Yugoslav economy, was in the middle of recession. As a result of the 1991–95 war, infrastructure sustained massive damage, especially the revenue-rich tourism industry. Privatization and transformation from a planned economy to a market economy was thus slow and unsteady.

During the rule of the Croatian Democratic Union (HDZ), Croatia initiated its privatization program in 1992 when companies began arranging sales of shares to their employees. Privatization revenues and two thirds of unsold shares were then transferred to the Development Fund, while the remainder of unsold shares was transferred to the Pension Fund and the Disability Insurance Fund, both controlled by the state. Privatization often involved appointing new managers close to HDZ, or even the party's leading members, a trend which discouraged foreign investors. The state also took full ownership of over 100 important large companies and appointed new managers there, who were also often members of the ruling party.

With the end of the war in 1995, Croatia's economy recovered moderately, but corruption, cronyism, and a general lack of transparency stymied economic reforms and foreign investment, accompanied by public distrust when many state-owned companies were sold to politically well-connected people at below-market prices, all of which were common to reforms that took place in most post-communist transition economies.

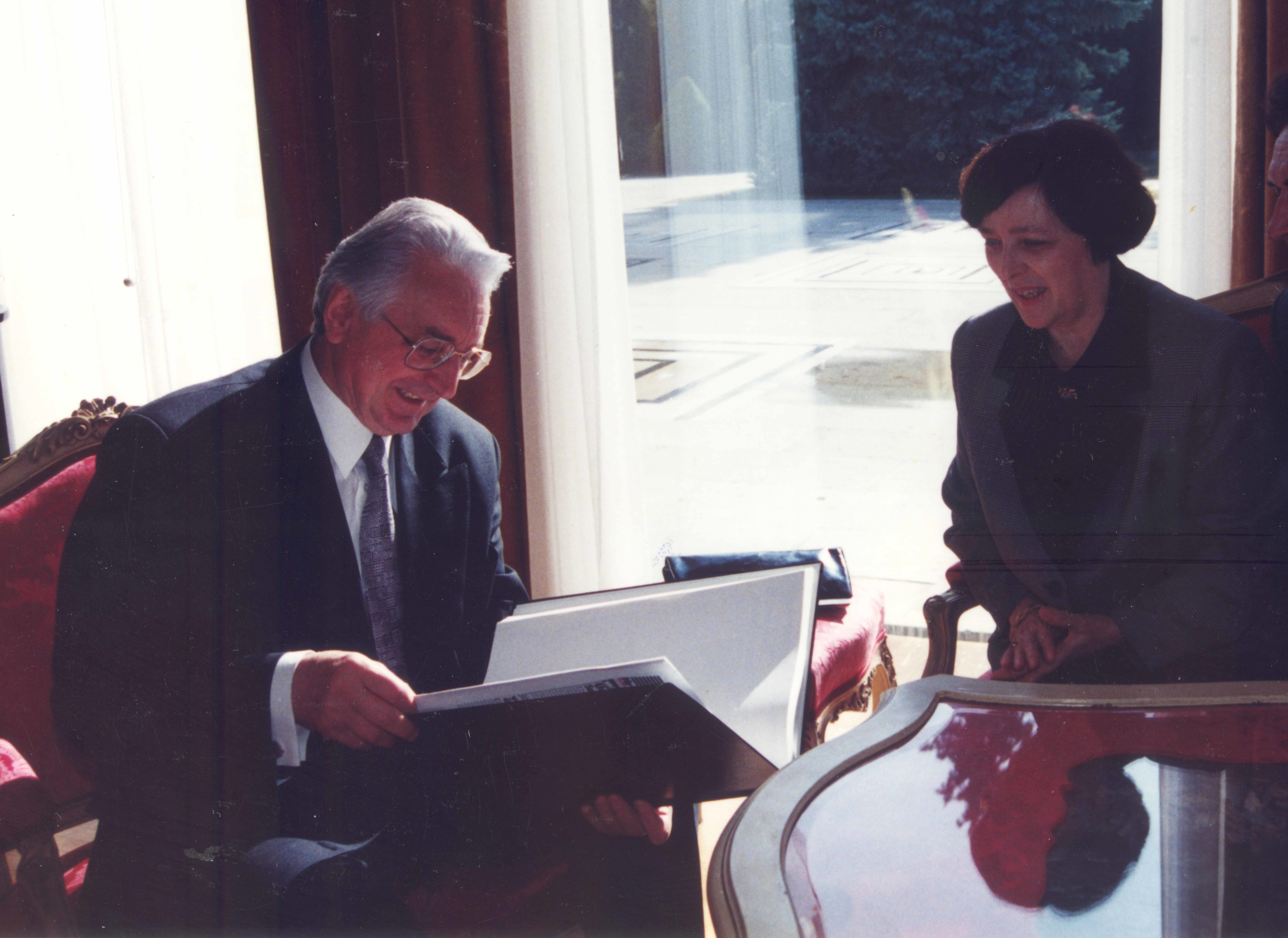
Croatian President Franjo Tuđman (left)

Primary method of privatization in Croatia was management employee buyouts, while the secondary method used was voucher privatization. In 1991 the private sector's share of GDP was 25 percent, and its share of employed workforce was 22 percent. The method of privatization contributed to the increase of state ownership because unsold shares were transferred to state funds. In 1999 the private sector's share in GDP reached 60 percent, which was significantly lower compared to other former socialist countries. The government retained 1-30% shareholdings in privatised firms in 33,4% of firms, and above 30% in 7,6% firms, much higher than other countries.

In 1995 a Ministry of Privatization was established with Ivan Penić as its first minister. The privatization program was criticized by Croatian economists who characterized it as crony capitalism. The ruling party was particularly criticised for transferring enterprises to a group of privileged owners connected to the party. Croatian president Franjo Tuđman was also a target of critics and allegations of nepotism and the likelihood that he personally profited. An alleged statement about 200 wealthy families that would manage Croatian economy is at times attributed to him, although others note that there is no evidence that Tuđman ever said that.

The privatization of large government-owned companies was practically halted during the war and in the years immediately following the conclusion of peace. As of 2000, roughly 70 percent of Croatia's major companies were still state-owned, including water, electricity, oil, transportation, telecommunications, and tourism.

== Economic impact ==
Year	GDP Growth	Deficit/Surplus*	Debt to GDP	Privatization revenues*
1994	5.9%	1.8%	22.20%	
1995	6.8%	-0.7%	19.30%	0.9%
1996	5.9%	-0.4%	28.50%	1.4%
1997	6.6%	-1.2%	27.30%	2.0%
1998	1.9%	0.5%	26.20%	3.6%
1999	-0.9%	-2.2%	28.50%	8.2%
2000	3.8%	-5.0%	34.30%	10.2%
2001	3.4%	-3.2%	35.20%	13.5%
2002	5.2%	-2.6%	34.80%	15.8%
*Including capital revenues *cumulative, in % of GDP Source: 1994–2002

== In popular culture ==
Croatian documentary Gazda ("The Boss") covers the rise of controversial privatization during the 1990s in Croatia.

== See also ==
- History of Croatia
- Economy of Croatia
- Miroslav Kutle
