= Minority discount =

Minority discount is an economic concept reflecting the notion that a partial ownership interest may be worth less than its proportional share of the total business. The concept applies to equities with voting power because the size of voting position provides additional benefits or drawbacks. For example, ownership of a 51% share in the business is usually worth more than 51% of its equity value—this phenomenon is called the premium for control. Conversely, ownership of a 30% share in the business may be worth less than 30% of its equity value. This is so because this minority ownership limits the scope of control over critical aspects of the business. Share prices of public companies usually reflect the minority discount. This is why take-private transactions involve a substantial premium over recently quoted prices.

== Properties of minority interest ==
On a per-share basis, buyers will pay less for minority interest versus a controlling or majority interest because a minority position strictly limits investors to make crucial business decisions. Below are some drawbacks penalizing minority shareholders.

- Minority owners do not manage the business.
- They cannot initiate a sale or liquidation of the business.
- They are limited to elect the company directors and to appoint its officers.
- They do not hire or fire employees.
- They do not declare and distribute dividends.
- They do not enter into contractual relationships with customers and suppliers.
- They do not raise debt or equity capital for the company.
- They do not approve strategy plans, mergers and acquisitions, or capital expenditures.

== Minority protection ==
The worse the minority shareholders' protection, the higher the minority discount. Nevertheless, minority owners may decrease the discount attached to their holdings. Some strategies to do so include inviting independent non-executive directors and shareholder activism. The activism can take several forms: proxy battles, publicity campaigns, shareholder resolutions, litigation, and negotiations with management.

== See also ==
- Associate company
- Business valuation
- Consolidation (business)
- Corporate governance
- Drag-along right
- Market for corporate control
- Minority interest
- Pre-emption right
- Tag-along right
- Voting interest
