= Market for corporate control =

The market for corporate control is the role of equity markets in facilitating corporate takeovers. This was first described in an article by HG Manne, "Mergers and the Market for Corporate Control". According to Manne:

The lower the stock price, relative to what it could be with more efficient management, the more attractive the take-over becomes to those who believe that they can manage the company more efficiently. And the potential return from the successful takeover and revitalization of a poorly run company can be enormous.

In this way the market for corporate control could magnify the efficacy of corporate governance rules, and facilitate greater accountability of directors to their investors.

== See also ==
- Associate company
- Business valuation
- Consolidation (business)
- Corporate governance
- Drag-along right
- Minority discount
- Minority interest
- Pre-emption right
- Tag-along right
- Voting interest
