= First-look deal =

Type of contract

When an actor enters into a first-look deal with a studio, they agree that any new project they get offered or develop can be bought or developed first by that studio before any competitors. This actor often also works as a producer or executive producer on such projects.

For any industry, in more legal language: a first-look deal is any contract containing a clause granting, usually for a fee or other consideration that covers a specified period of time, a pre-emption right, right of first refusal, or right of first offer (also called a right of first negotiation) to another party, who then is given the first opportunity to buy outright, co-own, invest in, license, etc., something that is newly coming into existence or on the market for the first time or after an absence, such as intellectual property (manuscript, musical composition, invention, artwork, business idea, etc.) or real property (real estate).

== Film industry ==
In the film industry, a "first-look deal" is an agreement where a writer and an independent production company—or a production company and a film studio—arrange for the potential buyer (usually a producer or studio) to pay a development fee in exchange for the exclusive right to preview a script or project in development before it’s shown to others. This gives the buyer the first opportunity to purchase, distribute, or move forward with pre-agreed terms. If the buyer passes on the project, the developer is then free to pitch it to other potential buyers. If the studio or company is not interested in the project, the nature of the deal allows the developer to take the project to other potential buyers.

== See also ==
- Tag-along right
- Drag-along right
- Overall deal
