= Hernádi (surname) =

Hungarian surname

Hernádi is a Hungarian surname. Notable people with the surname include:

- Fatima Hernadi (born 1955), Moroccan actress.
- Gyula Hernádi (1926–2005), Hungarian screenwriter.
- Judit Hernádi (born 1956), Hungarian actress.
- Lajos Hernádi (1906–1986), Hungarian pianist.
- Tibor Hernádi (1947–2012), Hungarian film director.
- Zsolt Hernádi (born 1960), Hungarian businessman.

See also:

- The Hernádi - Sanader legal process
