= INA-MOL dispute =

Dispute between the government of Croatia and MOL Plc.

The INA-MOL dispute was a dispute between the government of Croatia and MOL Plc., as to the management rights of INA d.d. MOL held the controlling interest in the company, while Croatian representatives maintained this controlling share was obtained illegally, through the bribery of the former Croatian prime minister Ivo Sanader. The dispute was brought to an arbitral tribunal under the United Nations Commission on International Trade Law Arbitration Rules and administered by the PCA, with the arbitral tribunal ruling in favor of MOL.

This prompted the Croatian government to shift their focus from proving the controlling share was obtained illegally, to buying out a majority share in INA d.d.

== Background ==
Following the declaration of independence of Croatia, the country began a number of privatization initiatives, intending to shift from socialist economics to economic liberalism. The sale of INA d.d. shares to MOL Plc. and other buyers was part of this privatization process.

The first public sale of INA d.d. shares happened in July 2003, when MOL Plc. acquired 25% of all shares for a price of €505 million. The first shareholders' agreement was signed at the time, establishing an oversight board with seven members: five to be named by the Croatian government, and two by MOL Plc. In November 2006, 44 000 Croatian citizens bought stocks as well, for a price of 2.8 billion kuna. INA d.d. stocks were included in the Zagreb Stock Exchange and London Stock Exchange for the first time. In October 2008 MOL Plc. bought another 22.15% of stocks, raising their total share to 47.15%. This made them the majority stakeholder, as the Croatian government was left with 44.83% of the shares.

In January 2009, the number of members in oversight board was raised from seven to nine, with MOL appointing five members, the Croatian government three members, and the remaining shareholders one member. MOL further gained the privilege of appointing three of six board members in INA d.d. as well. MOL Plc. had effectively gained ownership at that point. By mid-2011, the first allegations of bribery had surfaced, and USKOK had begun their investigation into Ivo Sanader and Zsolt Hernádi.

== The Hernádi - Sanader legal process ==
The legal proceedings against Ivo Sanader began in the County Court of Zagreb on 28 August 2011, with Sanader claiming innocence and pleading not guilty. The prosecutors claimed Sanader had accepted a €10 million bribe for changing the shareholder's agreement, which enabled MOL Plc. to gain ownership of INA d.d. After a three year proceeding, Sanader was found guilty of a number of criminal wrongdoings, and sentenced to a nine year prison term. This sentence was later overturned by the Supreme Court of Croatia, and Sanader was released on a 12.4 million kuna bail. This would prove to be crucial in the arbitration process.

The legal proceedings resumed, and Sanader was once again found guilty of accepting a bribe on 31 December 2019. He was sentenced, in a non-final judgment, to a six year prison term.

Hernádi was investigated by both Hungarian and Croatian authorities, for the alleged bribery. In early 2012, Hungarian legal authorities found Hernádi to be not guilty of all charges brought against him. Meanwhile, he was tried in absentia in Croatia. He was sentenced to a two-and a half year prison term, although Hungary refused to extradite him.

== The arbitration process ==
In 2014, the Croatian government began an arbitration process with MOL Plc. before the UNCITRAL. Croatian representatives wanted the 2009 changes to the shareholders' agreement, which enabled MOL Plc. to take over the controlling stake in INA d.d., to be made null and void. They based this claim on an alleged €10 million bribe made by the president of MOL Plc. Zsolt Hernádi to the, then current prime minister, Ivo Sanader. Hungary launched their own investigation into the matter, and dismissed all allegations of criminal activity in early 2012.

UNCITRAL made their ruling on 23 December 2016, ruling in favor of MOL Plc., and based their ruling on five points:

- There was inconsistency in the Croatian version of events as to the Hernádi questioning. USKOK claimed Hungary obstructed their investigation, after they had asked the Hungarian prosecutors to question Hernádi as to the alleged bribery. However, while USKOK claimed the questioning never took place, documents from Hungarian prosecutors, as well as documents from the County Court of Zagreb, show Zsolt Hernadi was questioned in 2010, although it was connected primarily to a separate case, the Podravka affair.
- It couldn't be proven that Ivo Sanader played an important role in the negotiations with MOL Plc., as to the changes in the shareholders' agreement. In fact, the evidence brought forward didn't show Sanader played a part in any detailed negotiations with the Hungarian company.
- Robert Ježić, an influential Croatian businessman during the 2000s, testified that the MOL Plc. representatives had through him paid a €5 million bribe to Sanader, in return for selling a controlling share in INA d.d. UNCITRAL found the witness unreliable, claiming Ježić "had a strong motive to shift blame onto Sanader". They furthermore brought forward various differences between a number of his statements, made throughout the legal proceedings against Sanader. There was also no evidence anyone beside Ježić was aware that this alleged €5 million bribe took place.
- The Croatian representatives failed to prove good relations between Ježić and Sanader, which would have been the basis for bribery to take place.
- Sanader had been found guilty of criminal wrongdoing by the first instance court, but the Supreme Court of Croatia later overturned this first instance verdict against Sanader, although this ruling was heavily criticized by Croatian legal experts. This contributed to the idea that no bribe actually took place.

== See also ==
- Croatia-Hungary relations
