= Shareholders' agreement =

Agreement between shareholders of a company

A shareholders' agreement (sometimes referred to in the U.S. as a stockholders' agreement) (SHA) is an enforceable agreement amongst the shareholders or members of a company. In practical effect, it is analogous to a partnership agreement. There are advantages of the shareholder's agreement: they provide a contractual remedy if their terms are broken, and they can help the corporate entity to maintain the absence of publicity and maintain confidentiality. Nonetheless, there are also some disadvantages that should be considered, such as the limited effect to the third parties (especially assignees and share purchasers) and that alteration of the terms of an agreement can be time consuming.

== Purpose ==
In strict legal theory, the relationships amongst the shareholders and those between the shareholders and the company are regulated by the constitutional documents of the company. However, where there are a relatively small number of shareholders, like in a startup company, it is quite common in practice for the shareholders to supplement the constitutional document. There are a number of reasons why the shareholders may wish to supplement (or supersede) the constitutional documents of the company in this way:

- a company's constitutional documents are normally available for public inspection, whereas the terms of a shareholders' agreement, as a private law contract, are normally confidential between the parties.
- contractual arrangements are generally cheaper and less formal to form, administer, revise or terminate.
- the shareholders might wish to provide for disputes to be resolved by arbitration, or in the courts of a foreign country (meaning a country other than the country in which the company is incorporated). In some countries, corporate law does not permit such dispute resolution clauses to be included in the constitutional documents.
- greater flexibility; the shareholders may anticipate that the company's business requires regular changes to their arrangements, and it may be unwieldy to repeatedly amend the corporate constitution.
- corporate law in the relevant country may not provide sufficient protection for minority shareholders, who may seek to better protect their position by using a shareholders' agreement.
- to provide formulas for share valuation to cut down on shareholders disputes over the value they can demand for their shares either on voluntary or on compulsory transfers
- to restrict the activities of shareholders – preventing abuse of position and competing activities
- to provide mechanisms for removing minority shareholders which preserve the company as a going concern.

== Risks ==
There are also certain risks which can be associated with putting a shareholders' agreement in place in some countries.

- In some countries, using a shareholders' agreement can constitute a partnership, which can have unintended tax consequences, or result in liability attaching to shareholders in the event of a bankruptcy.
- Where the shareholders' agreement is inconsistent with the constitutional documents, the efficacy of the parties' intended arrangement can be undermined.
- Countries with notarial formalities, where notarial fees are set by the value of the subject matter, parties can find that their agreement is subject to prohibitively high notarial costs, which, if they fail to pay, would result in the agreement being unenforceable.
- In certain circumstances, a shareholders' agreement can be put forward as evidence of a conspiracy and/or monopolistic practices.

== Common characteristics ==
Shareholders' agreements vary enormously between different countries and different commercial fields. However, in a characteristic joint venture or business startup, a shareholders' agreement would normally be expected to regulate the following matters:

- regulating the ownership and voting rights of the shares in the company, including
  - Lock-down provisions
  - restrictions on transferring shares, or granting security interests over shares
  - pre-emption rights and rights of first refusal in relation to any shares issued by the company (often called a buy-sell agreement)
  - "tag-along" and "drag-along" rights (Note: "Tag along" rights refer to the power of a minority shareholder to sell their shares to a purchaser at the same price as any other selling shareholder, ie. if one shareholder wants to sell, they can only do so if the buyer agrees to buy out the other shareholders who wish to sell at the same price. "Drag along" refers to the power of larger shareholders to compel the minority shareholder to sell when a purchaser wants to acquire 100% (or in some cases a majority stake) of the company, ie. a purchaser wishes to buy the company at a high valuation but only if they can purchase the entire issued share capital, and 3 out of the 4 shareholders wish to sell, but the 4th does not, well drafted drag-along rights would enable the 3 shareholders to compel the 4th to sell their share at the same price.)
  - minority protection provisions
- control and management of the company, which may include
  - power for certain shareholders to designate individuals for election to the board of directors
  - terms of employment for directors
  - imposing super-majority voting requirements for "reserved matters" which are of key importance to the parties
  - imposing requirements to provide shareholders with accounts or other information that they might not otherwise be entitled to by law
- making provision for the resolution of any future disputes between shareholders, including
  - deadlock provisions
  - dispute resolution provisions
- protecting the competitive interests of the company which may include
  - restrictions on a shareholder's ability to be involved in a competing business to the company
  - restrictions on a shareholder's ability to poach key employees of the company
  - key terms with suppliers or customers who are also shareholders
- protecting selling rights of shareholders, including
  - piggy-back clauses, which come into effect when a majority shareholder decides to sell all or a significant part of their shares to a third party. Other shareholders can then 'piggy-back' onto the original shareholder's offer to the third party, and offer to sell their shares to the third party for the same agreed upon price.

In addition, shareholders' agreements will often make provision for the following:

- the nature and amount of initial contribution (whether capital contribution or other) to the company
- the proposed nature of the business
- how any future capital contributions or financing arrangements are to be made
- the governing law of the shareholders' agreement
- ethical practices or environmental practices
- allocation of key roles or responsibilities

== Registration ==
In most countries, registration of a shareholders' agreement is not required for it to be effective. Indeed, it is the perceived greater flexibility of contract law over corporate law that provides much of the raison d'être for shareholders' agreements.

This flexibility, however, can give rise to conflicts between a shareholders' agreement and the constitutional documents of a company. Although laws differ across countries, in general most conflicts are resolved as follows:

- as against outside parties, only the constitutional documents regulate the company's powers and proceedings.
- as between the company and its shareholders, a breach of the shareholders' agreement which does not breach the constitutional documents will still be a valid corporate act, but it may sound in damages against the party who breaches the agreement.
- as between the company and its shareholders, a breach of the constitutional documents which does not breach the shareholders' agreement will nonetheless usually be an invalid corporate act.
- characteristically, courts will not grant an injunction or award specific performance in relation to a shareholders' agreement where to do so would be inconsistent with the company's constitutional documents.
