= Piggy =

Piggy, piggie or piggies may refer to:

== As a nickname ==
- Denis D'Amour (1959–2005), guitarist for the Canadian metal band Voivod
- Fan Chun Yip (born 1976), Hong Kong retired football goalkeeper
- Piggy French (born 1980), British equestrienne
- Alphonso Gerard (1916–2002), American Negro league baseball player
- Ward Lambert (1888–1958), American college men's basketball coach
- Robert Muldoon (1921–1992), 31st Prime Minister of New Zealand
- David Powell (rugby union) (born 1942), former England international rugby union player
- Mark Riddell (born 1980), Australian former rugby league player, commentator
- Edwin Simandl, owner of the Orange Tornadoes and Newark Tornadoes of the National Football League
- Piggy Ward (1867–1912), American professional baseball player
- Roscoe Word (American football guard) (1882–1942), American college football player and coach

== Fictional characters ==
- Miss Piggy, a Muppets character
- Penny Piggy, from the Piggy franchise
- Piggy (Merrie Melodies), from the Merrie Melodies cartoons
- Piggy (Power Rangers), from Power Rangers: S.P.D.
- Piggy Malone, in the BBC television series The Two Ronnies
- Piggy the Penguin, in the animated series Eek! The Cat
- Piggy, a major character in the novel Lord of the Flies
- Piggy, in the 2003 novel Gone to the Dogs
- "Piggies", slang term for Pequeninos, an alien species in the Ender's Game series by Orson Scott Card
- Zhu Bajie, from the novel Journey to the West
- Sir Francis "Piggy" Beekman, in the 1953 movie Gentlemen Prefer Blondes

== Entertainment ==
- Piggie (film), 2003 American drama film
- Piggy (2012 film), British horror crime film
- Piggy (2022 film), the English title of Cerdita, a Spanish horror film
- Piggy (Roblox experience), a Roblox experience developed by MiniToon about an officer searching for a missing pig
- "Piggy" (song), by Nine Inch Nails from their album The Downward Spiral
- Piggy D., stage name of guitarist Matt Montgomery (born 1975)
- "Piggies", a song by the Beatles from The Beatles
- "Piggies", a song by Space from Tin Planet

== Other uses ==
- Tip-cat, an outdoor game also called a piggy
- Slang for toe
- Child's term for pig

== See also ==
- Piggybacking (disambiguation)
- Piglet (disambiguation)
- Pigi (disambiguation)
