= Independence of Croatia =

Political and constitutional changes of 1990

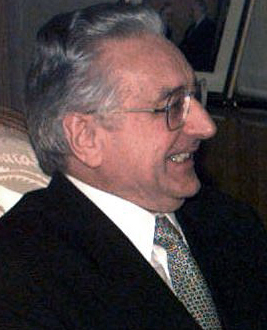
Franjo Tuđman, first democratically elected and first president of modern independent Republic of Croatia

The independence of Croatia was a process started with the changes in the political system and the constitutional changes in 1990 that transformed the Socialist Republic of Croatia into the modern Republic of Croatia, which in turn proclaimed the first Constitution of Croatia, and held the 1991 Croatian independence referendum.

After the country formally declared independence in June 1991 and the dissolution of its association with Yugoslavia, it introduced a three-month moratorium on the decision when urged to do so by the European Community and the Conference on Security and Cooperation in Europe. During that time the Croatian War of Independence started.

On 8 October 1991, the Croatian Parliament severed all remaining ties with Yugoslavia. The Badinter Arbitration Committee had to rule on the matter. Finally, Croatian independence was internationally recognized in January 1992, when both the European Economic Community and the United Nations granted Croatia diplomatic recognition, and the country was accepted into the United Nations shortly thereafter.

== Background ==
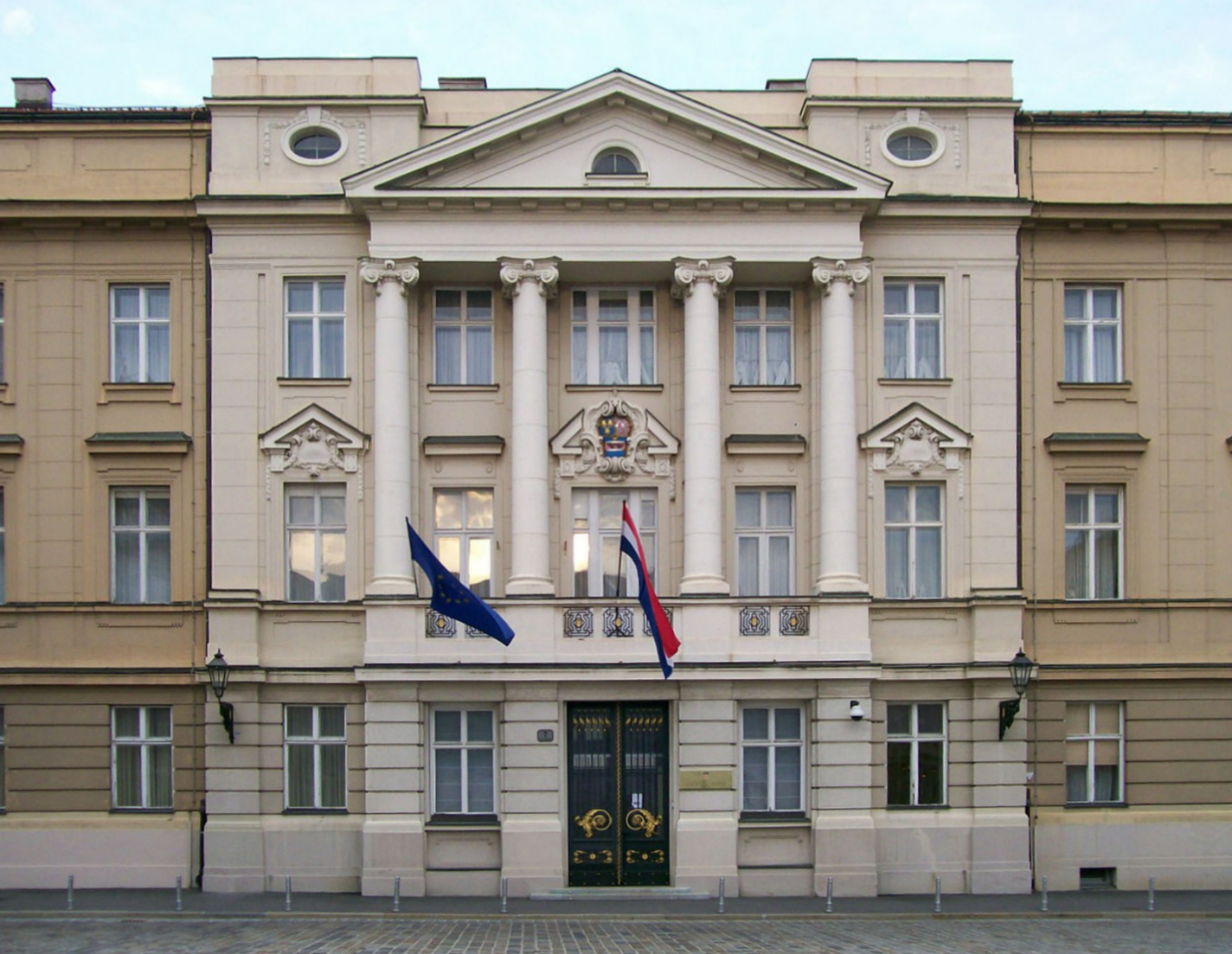
Croatian Parliament building

During the World War II period from 1941 to 1945, Croatia was established as a puppet state called the Independent State of Croatia, governed by the ultranationalist, fascist Ustaše, backed by Nazi Germany and Fascist Italy within the territory of the Kingdom of Yugoslavia. From 1945 it became a Socialist federal unit of the Socialist Federal Republic of Yugoslavia, a one-party state run by the League of Communists of Croatia created at the end of World War II in Yugoslavia. Croatia enjoyed a degree of autonomy within the Yugoslav federation. At the turn of the 1970s, a Croatian national protest movement called the Croatian Spring was suppressed by Yugoslav leadership. Still, the 1974 Yugoslav Constitution gave increased autonomy to federal units, essentially fulfilling a goal of the Croatian Spring and providing a legal basis for independence of the federative constituents.

In the 1980s, the political situation in Yugoslavia deteriorated, with national tension fanned by the 1986 Serbian SANU Memorandum and the 1989 coups in Vojvodina, Kosovo and Montenegro. As Slovenia and Croatia began to seek greater autonomy within the federation, including confederate status and even full independence, the nationalist ideas started to grow within the ranks of the still-ruling League of Communists. As Slobodan Milošević rose to power in Serbia, his speeches favored continuation of a unified Yugoslav state—one in which all power would be centralized in Belgrade. In March 1989, the crisis in Yugoslavia deepened after the adoption of amendments to the Serbian constitution that allowed the Serbian republic's government to re-assert effective power over the autonomous provinces of Kosovo and Vojvodina. Up until that time, a number of political decisions were legislated from within these provinces, and they had a vote on the Yugoslav federal presidency level (six members from the republics and two members from the autonomous provinces). In the Gazimestan speech, delivered on 28 June 1989, Milošević remarked on the current "battles and quarrels", saying that even though there were currently no armed battles, the possibility could not be excluded yet. The general political situation grew more tense when in 1989 Vojislav Šešelj publicly consorted with Momčilo Đujić, a World War II Chetnik leader. Years later, Croatian Serb leader Milan Babić testified that Momčilo Đujić had financially supported the Serbs in Croatia in the 1990s. Conversely, Franjo Tuđman made international visits during the late 1980s to garner support from the Croatian diaspora for the Croatian national cause.

== Transition to democracy and political crisis ==
In mid-1989, political parties other than the Communist Party were first allowed, starting a transition from the one-party system. A number of new parties were founded in Croatia, including the Croatian Democratic Union (Croatian: Hrvatska demokratska zajednica) (HDZ), led by Franjo Tuđman.

In January 1990, the League of Communists fragmented along national lines, with the Croatian faction demanding a looser federation. At the 14th Extraordinary Congress of the League of Communists of Yugoslavia, on 20 January 1990, the delegations of the republics could not agree on the main issues in the Yugoslav federation. The Croatian and Slovenian delegations demanded a looser federation, while the Serbian delegation, headed by Milošević, demanded re-centralization. As a result, the Slovenian and Croatian delegates left the Congress. Having completed the anti-bureaucratic revolution in Vojvodina, Kosovo, and Montenegro, Serbia secured four out of eight votes on the federal presidency in 1991, and it was able to heavily influence decision-making at the federal level, because unfavorable decisions could be blocked; this rendered the governing body ineffective. This situation led to objections from other republics and calls for reform of the Yugoslav Federation.

In February 1990, Jovan Rašković founded the Serb Democratic Party (SDS) in Knin. Its program stated that the "regional division of Croatia is outdated" and that it "does not correspond with the interest of Serb people". The party program endorsed redrawing regional and municipal lines to reflect the ethnic composition of the areas, and asserted the right of territories with a "special ethnic composition" to become autonomous. This echoed Milošević position that internal Yugoslav borders should be redrawn to permit all Serbs to live in a single country. Prominent members of the SDS were Milan Babić and Milan Martić, both of whom later became high-ranking RSK officials. During his later trial, Babić would testify that there was a media campaign directed from Belgrade that portrayed the Serbs in Croatia as being threatened with genocide by the Croat majority and that he fell prey to this propaganda. On 4 March 1990, a meeting of 50,000 Serbs was held at Petrova Gora. People at the rally shouted negative remarks aimed at Tuđman, chanted "This is Serbia", and expressed support for Milošević.

== Political moves and civil unrest ==
In late April and early May 1990, the first multi-party elections were held in Croatia, with Franjo Tuđman's win resulting in further nationalist tensions.

A tense atmosphere prevailed in 1990: on 13 May 1990, a football game was held in Zagreb between Zagreb's Dinamo team and Belgrade's Crvena Zvezda team. The game erupted into violence between football fans and police.

On 30 May 1990, the new Croatian Parliament held its first session. President Tuđman announced his manifesto for a new Constitution and a multitude of political, economic, and social changes, including a plan for Yugoslavia as a confederation of sovereign states.

On 25 July 1990, Croatia made constitutional amendments that asserted and effected its sovereignty – the "Socialist" prefix was dropped from the country's name, the office of President of the Republic replaced that of President of the Presidency, in addition to other changes. The changes in the July 1990 Croatian Constitution did not relate to the status of the Serbs, which remained identical to the one granted by the 1974 Croatian Constitution (based on the 1974 Yugoslav Constitution).

Nationalist Serbs in Croatia boycotted the Sabor and seized control of Serb-inhabited territory, setting up road blocks and voting for those areas to become autonomous. The Serb "autonomous oblasts" would soon become increasingly intent on achieving independence from Croatia.

After HDZ came to power, they conducted a purge of Serbs employed in public administration, especially the police. The Serbs of Croatia held a disproportionate number of official posts: in 1984, 22.6% of the members of the League of Communists of Croatia and 17.7% of appointed officials in Croatia were Serbs, including 28-31% in the Ministry of the Interior (the police). Whereas, in 1981, they represented 11.5% and in 1991, 12.2% of the total population of Croatia. An even greater proportion of those posts had been held by Serbs in Croatia earlier on, which created a perception that the Serbs were guardians of the communist regime.

President Tuđman made several clumsy remarks — such as the one from a 16 April 1990 speech that he was 'glad that his wife is not a Serb' that the Croatian historian Ante Nazor has described as something taken out of context. All this was deliberately distorted by Milošević's media in order to artificially spark fear that any form of an independent Croatia is a new "ustashe state": in one instance, TV Belgrade showed Tuđman shaking hands with German Chancellor Helmut Kohl, accusing them of plotting to impose "a Fourth Reich". The new Tuđman government was nationalistic and insensitive towards Serbs, but did not pose a threat to them before the war.

The political crisis escalated when the Serb-populated areas attempted to form an enclave called Serbian Krajina which intended to separate from Croatia if Croatia itself attempted to separate from Yugoslavia. The Serb leadership in Krajina refused to recognize the government of the Republic of Croatia as having sovereignty over them. The crisis began in August 1990 with the Log Revolution as Croatian Serbs cut down trees and used them to block roads. This hampered Croatian tourism and caused alarm in the province of Dalmatia as Croatia was hosting the 1990 European Athletics Championships in Split.

On 21 December 1990, a new "Christmas Constitution" was passed, that adopted a liberal democracy. The constitution defined Croatia as "the national state of the Croatian nation and a state of members of other nations and minorities who are its citizens: Serbs... who are guaranteed equality with citizens of Croatian nationality..." The status of Serbs was changed from an explicitly mentioned nation (narod) to a nation listed together with minorities (narodi i manjine). This constitutional change was also read by the majority of Serb politicians as taking away some of the rights that the Serbs had been granted by the previous Socialist constitution, and it fuelled extremism among the Serbs of Croatia. This was not based on the literal reading of the former Constitution of SR Croatia, which had also treated solely Croats as a constitutive nation, saying Croatia was "national state" for Croats, "state" for Serbs and other minorities.

On 21 February 1991, Croatia declared its Constitution and laws supreme to that of the SFRY, and the Parliament enacted a formal resolution on the process of disassociation (Croatian: razdruženje) from SFR Yugoslavia and possible new association with other sovereign republics.

Over two hundred armed incidents involving the rebel Serbs and Croatian police were reported between August 1990 and April 1991.

== Independence referendum and decisions ==
On 19 May 1991, the Croatian authorities held the Croatian referendum on independence. Serb local authorities called for a boycott of the vote, which was largely followed by Croatian Serbs. In the end, a majority of Croatians endorsed independence from Yugoslavia, with a turnout of 83.56% and the two referendum questions answered positively by 93.24% and 92.18% (resp.) of the total number of votes.

On 25 June 1991, the country declared its independence from the SFRY, finalizing its effort to end its status as a constituent republic. That decision of the parliament decision was partially boycotted by left-wing party deputies.

The European Economic Community and the Conference on Security and Cooperation in Europe immediately urged both Croatia and Slovenia that they would not be recognized as independent states because of a fear of a civil war in Yugoslavia. By mid-1991, the Croatian War of Independence had already started. Serb-controlled areas of Croatia were part of the three "Serb Autonomous Oblasts" later known as the Republic of Serbian Krajina, bulk of which would not be under Croatian control until 1995, and the remaining parts in 1998.

Croatia was first recognized as an independent state on 26 June 1991 by Slovenia, which declared its own independence on the same day as Croatia. But by 29 June, the Croatian and Slovenian authorities agreed to a three-month moratorium on the independence declaration, in an effort to ease tensions. The Brijuni Agreement was formally signed in a meeting of the European Community Ministerial Troika, the Yugoslav, Serbian, Slovenian and Croatian authorities on 7 July. Lithuania was the sole state that recognized Croatia on 30 July.

The Badinter Arbitration Committee was set up by the Council of Ministers of the European Economic Community (EEC) on 27 August 1991 to provide legal advice and criteria for recognition to former Yugoslav republics. The five-member commission consisted of presidents of constitutional courts in the EEC.

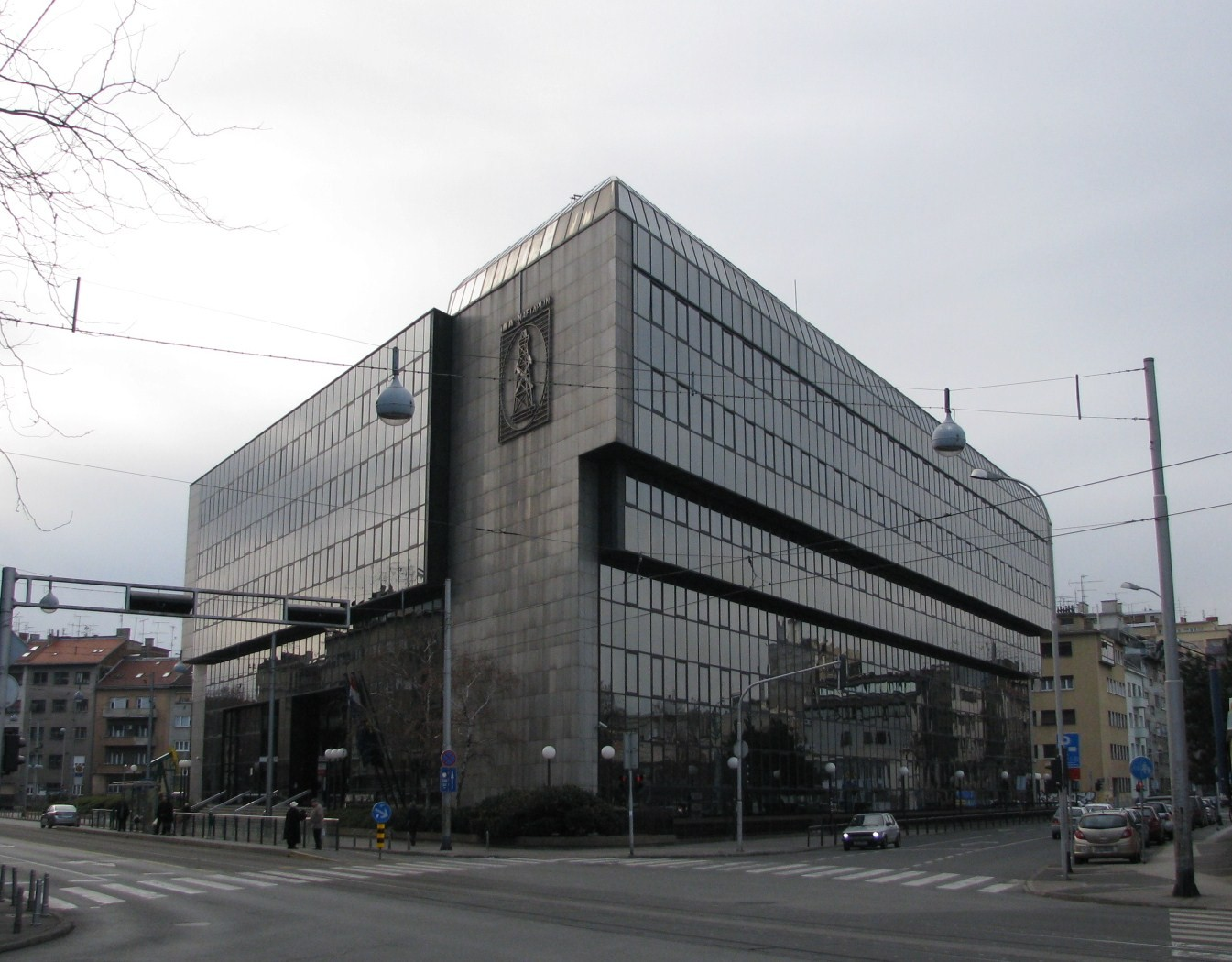
INA building in Šubićeva Street, Zagreb was selected for security reasons as the venue for parliament's declaration of independence on 8 October 1991

On 7 October, the eve of expiration of the moratorium, the Yugoslav Air Force attacked Banski dvori, the main government building in Zagreb. On 8 October 1991, the moratorium expired, and the Croatian Parliament severed all remaining ties with Yugoslavia. That particular session of the parliament was held in the INA building on Pavao Šubić Avenue in Zagreb due to security concerns provoked by recent Yugoslav air raid; Specifically, it was feared that the Yugoslav Air Force might attack the parliament building. This decision was reached unanimously in the Parliament, and the only parliamentary deputies missing were some from the Serb parties that had been absent since early 1991.

== War and general recognition ==
In the period following the declaration of independence, the war escalated, with the sieges of Vukovar and Dubrovnik, and fighting elsewhere. The 1991 Yugoslav campaign in Croatia, which started in September 1991, caused the deaths of thousands and displacement of hundreds of thousands of people in Croatia.

Germany advocated quick recognition of Croatia, in order to stop ongoing violence in Serb-inhabited areas, with Helmut Kohl requesting recognition in the Bundestag on 4 September. Kohl's position was opposed by France, the United Kingdom, and the Netherlands, but the countries agreed to pursue a common approach by following Germany's unilateral action. On 10 October, two days after the Croatian Parliament confirmed the declaration of independence, the EEC decided to postpone any decision to recognize Croatia for two months. German foreign minister Hans Dietrich Genscher later wrote that the EEC decided to recognize Croatian independence in two months if the war had not ended by then. With the war still ongoing when the deadline expired, Germany presented its decision to recognize Croatia as its policy and duty. Germany's position was supported by Italy and Denmark. France and the UK attempted to prevent German recognition by drafting a United Nations resolution requesting that no country take unilateral actions which could worsen the situation in Yugoslavia.

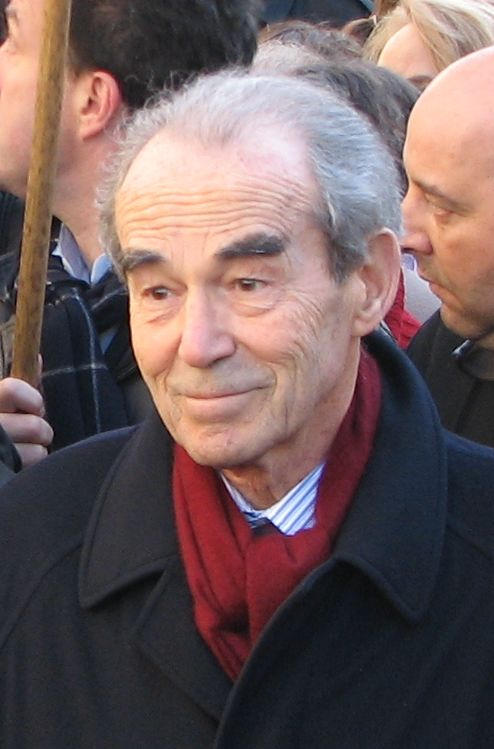
Robert Badinter presided over the Arbitration Commission of the Conference on Yugoslavia

Starting in late November 1991, the Badinter Commission rendered a series of ten opinions. The Commission stated, among other things, that Yugoslavia was in the process of dissolution, and that the internal boundaries of Yugoslav republics could not be altered unless freely agreed upon. Factors in the preservation of Croatia's pre-war borders were the Yugoslav federal constitutional amendments of 1971 and 1974, granting that sovereign rights were exercised by the federal units, and that the federation had only the authority specifically transferred to it by the constitution. The borders had been defined by demarcation commissions in 1947.

Ultimately, France and the UK backed down during the Security Council debate on the matter on 14 December, when Germany appeared determined to defy the UN resolution. On 17 December, the EEC formally agreed to grant Croatia diplomatic recognition on 15 January 1992, on the basis of its request and a positive opinion of the Badinter Arbitration Commission.

In its Opinion No. 5 on the specific matter of Croatian independence, the Commission ruled that Croatia's independence should not yet be recognized, because the new Croatian Constitution did not incorporate protections for minorities required by European Community. In response to this decision, the President of Croatia Franjo Tuđman wrote to Robert Badinter, giving assurances that this deficit would be remedied.

Ukraine and Latvia were the first to react by recognizing Croatian independence in the second week of December. The following week, Iceland and Germany recognized it, on 19 December 1991, as the first western European countries to do so.

In response to the decisions of the Badinter Commission, the RSK formally declared its separation from Croatia on 19 December, but its statehood and independence were not recognized internationally. On 26 December, Yugoslavia announced plans for a smaller state, which could include the territory captured from Croatia during the war. This plan was later rejected by the UN General Assembly in 1995. Estonia recognized Croatia on 31 December.

A ceasefire of 3 January 1992 finally led to stabilization and a significant reduction in violence.

The Holy See and San Marino, on 13 and 14 January resp., decided to recognize Croatia before the EEC-scheduled date of 15 January. The European Economic Community finally granted Croatia diplomatic recognition on 15 January 1992, and the United Nations did so in May 1992.

== Aftermath ==
With the end of 1991, the second Yugoslavia effectively ceased to exist as a state, with the prime minister Ante Marković and the president of the presidency Stjepan Mesić resigning in December 1991, and a caretaker government representing it until the country's formal dissolution in April 1992.

The war effectively ended in August 1995 with a decisive victory for Croatia as a result of Operation Storm. Croatia established its present-day borders when the remaining Serb-held areas of eastern Slavonia were restored to Croatia pursuant to the Erdut Agreement of November 1995, with the process concluded in January 1998.

== Legacy ==
Between 2002 and 2019, 8 October was celebrated as Croatia's Independence Day, while 25 June was recognized as Statehood Day. Previously, 30 May, marking the day when the first democratic parliament was constituted in 1990, had been commemorated as Statehood Day.However, a law enacted in 2019 restored 30 May as Statehood Day (an official public holiday), while 25 June (Independence Day) and 8 October (Day of the Croatian Parliament) were designated as working memorial days.

Although it is not a public holiday, 15 January is marked as the day Croatia won international recognition by Croatian media and politicians. On the day's tenth anniversary in 2002, the Croatian National Bank minted a 25 kuna commemorative coin.

== Symbols ==
Croatian coat of arms and flag used in 1990 and 1991
Flag used 27 June – 21 December 1990

Coat of arms used 27 June – 21 December 1990

Flag used from 21 December 1990

Coat of arms used from 21 December 1990

== Sources ==
- Bjelajac, Mile; Žunec, Ozren; Mieczyslaw Boduszynski; Raphael Draschtak; Igor Graovac; Sally Kent; Rüdiger Malli; Srdja Pavlović; Jason Vuić (2009). "The War in Croatia, 1991–1995" (PDF). In Ingrao, Charles W.; Emmert, Thomas Allan (eds.). Confronting the Yugoslav Controversies: a Scholars' Initiative (PDF). Purdue University Press. ISBN 978-1-55753-533-7.
- "The Prosecutor of the Tribunal against Slobodan Milošević (IT-02-54) - Indictment" (PDF). International Criminal Tribunal for the former Yugoslavia. October 22, 2002.
- Brown, Cynthia; Karim, Farhad (1995). Playing the "Communal Card": Communal Violence and Human Rights. New York City: Human Rights Watch. ISBN 9781564321527.
- Frucht, Richard C. (2005). Eastern Europe: An Introduction to the People, Lands, and Culture. Santa Barbara, California: ABC-CLIO. ISBN 978-1-57607-800-6.
- Pešić, Vesna (April 1996). "Serbian Nationalism and the Origins of the Yugoslav Crisis". Peaceworks (8). United States Institute of Peace. Archived from the original on November 10, 2010.
- "The Prosecutor vs. Milan Martic - Judgement" (PDF). International Criminal Tribunal for the former Yugoslavia. June 12, 2007.
- Bonacci Skenderović, Dunja; Jareb, Mario (July 2004). "Hrvatski nacionalni simboli između negativnih stereotipa i istine". Journal of Contemporary History. 36 (2). Croatian Institute of History: 731–760. ISSN 0590-9597.
