= Tarján, Hungary =

Village in Hungary

Tarján Tarian
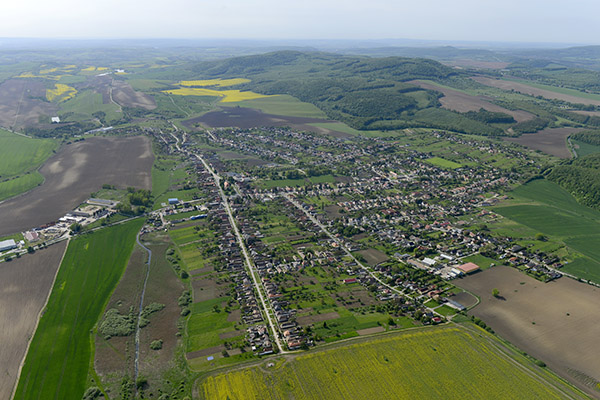
- Aerial view

- Coat of arms

- Location of Tarján
- Coordinates: 47.61053°N 18.51103°E
- Country: Hungary
- County: Komárom-Esztergom

Area
  - Total: 43.07 km^{2} (16.63 sq mi)

Population (2004)
  - Total: 2,804
  - Density: 65.1/km^{2} (169/sq mi)
- Time zone: UTC+1 (CET)
  - Summer (DST): UTC+2 (CEST)
- Postal code: 2831
- Area code: 34
- Website: www.tarjan.hu

Tarján (German: Tarian) is a village in Komárom-Esztergom County, Hungary.

== Notable people ==
- Zsolt Hernádi, Hungarian businessman
