= Henry Manne =

American legal scholar (1928–2015)

- Portrait of Manne
- Born: May 10, 1928; New Orleans, Louisiana
- Died: January 17, 2017 (aged 88)
- Occupations: Writer, academic

Henry G. Manne (May 10, 1928 – January 17, 2015) was an American writer and academic, considered a founder of the law and economics discipline. He was Dean Emeritus of the George Mason University School of Law.

Born in New Orleans, Louisiana, Manne held a B.A. in economics from Vanderbilt University (1950), J.D. from the University of Chicago (1952), LLM from Yale University (1953), J.S.D. from Yale University (1966), LL.D. from Seattle University (1987), LL.D. from the Universidad Francisco Marroquin in Guatemala (1987) and LLD from George Mason University (1998).

The national Henry G. Manne Moot Court Competition for Law & Economics, where law students from around the country have an opportunity to make legal and economic arguments on the merits of a complex policy problem, and the Henry G. Manne Program in Law and Economics Studies of the George Mason Law School's Law and Economics Center are named for him.

== Career ==
Manne received a B.A., cum laude, in Economics in 1950 at Vanderbilt University, his J.D. at the University of Chicago Law School in 1952 and his LLM (1953) and S.J.D. at Yale Law School in 1966. He received honorary doctorates in law from Seattle University, Universidad Francisco Maraquin (Guatemala), and George Mason University. He was Dean Emeritus and University Professor Emeritus at the George Mason University School of Law, where he was dean from 1986 to 1996 and university professor from 1986 to 1999. He had also taught at St. Louis University, the University of Wisconsin, George Washington University, the University of Rochester, University of Miami and Emory University. He was distinguished visiting professor at Ave Maria Law School in Naples, Florida.

During his lifetime he was a member of numerous professional organizations and boards and an Honorary Life Member of the American Law and Economics Association, which honored him as one of the four founders of the field of Law and Economics. Professor Manne published many books and articles, with emphasis on law and economics, the free market, and securities regulation. His development of the theory of a "market for corporate control" is credited with opening the entire field of corporate law to economic analysis, and his 1966 book, Insider Trading and the Stock Market, began, and still heavily influences, the vast literature on that subject. He was a frequent contributor to the Wall Street Journal. The Liberty Fund, of Indianapolis, Indiana, recently published The Collected Works of Henry G. Manne in three volumes.

Among his notable educational innovations are the Law and Economics Center (LEC), the first academic center devoted to the development of the field of law and economics (presently part of the George Mason University School of Law); the Economics Institutes for law professors; the Law Institutes for economists; the Economics Institutes for Federal Judges; the first specialized law degree program for PhDs in economics; and the first law school (George Mason) whose curriculum was built around the use of economics in law.
