= Deadlock provision =

A deadlock provision, or deadlock resolution clause, is a contractual clause or series of clauses in a shareholders' agreement or other form of joint venture agreement which determines how disagreements on key issues are to be resolved in relation to the management of the enterprise. The drafting of the deadlock provisions will often depend to a great extent upon what the key issues that the parties want to ensure consensus upon are.

The main focus of most deadlock provisions are the termination provisions. The principle underlying them is that a successful business enterprise should not be destroyed solely because the two partners are unable to agree on a core issue; the value of the business as a going concern should be preserved, and a fair way should be found to allow one party to bow out with fair recompense for giving up their share in the venture.

== Characteristics ==
Deadlock provisions vary enormously between different countries and with respect to different types of transactions. However, characteristically the format of the provision will be as follows:

1. Certain "key matters" will be designated as matters upon which deadlocks can arise. These will usually be fairly fundamental matters relating to the management and control of the business.
2. The provisions will then indicate if a "key matter" is raised at a certain number of consecutive meetings (occasionally just one meeting, but more often two or three) of the board of directors or other management organ of the business, a deadlock is said to have arisen.
3. The two parties may then be asked to summarise their differences in writing, and ordinarily senior personnel on either side will meet to try to find an amicable resolution to the deadlock. The provisions may require that a mediator may or shall be involved.
4. If the parties fail to find an amicable solution, then the termination provisions will normally operate.

== Termination provisions ==
There are as many different types of termination provisions as the ingenuity of lawyers can create. However, a number of specific types of termination provisions have come to be used fairly regularly in commercial transactions where the parties are of equal standing in the venture, and have acquired characteristically descriptive names.

- Russian roulette. A draconian solution to a deadlock, a Russian roulette provision requires one of the two deadlocked parties to serve a notice on the other party, and the serving party will name an all-cash price at which it values a half interest in the business. The party receiving the notice then has the option to either buy the other party out, or sell out to the other party, at that price.
- Texas shoot-out. Another dramatic solution to a deadlock, a Texas shoot-out involves each party sending a sealed all-cash bid to an umpire stating the price at which they are willing to buy out the other party. The sealed bids are opened together, and the highest sealed bid "wins", and that bidder must then buy (and the "loser" must sell) the other half share in the business.
- Mexican shoot-out (also called 'Dutch auction). A variation on the Texas shoot-out (and slightly different from the traditional Dutch auction), the parties send in sealed bids indicating the minimum price that they would be prepared to sell their half share for. Whichever sealed bid is the higher "wins" and that bidder then buys the "loser's" share at the price indicated in the loser's sealed bid.
- Multi-choice procedure. A softer option, when the parties do not wish to commit themselves to a more dramatic termination procedure, the deadlock can often provide for a series of options, one of which the parties must agree on, if the deadlock cannot be resolved. The benefit of an open textured clause like this is that, when faced with the draconian consequences of the next step, the parties are thought to be better able to compromise. The downside is that if the parties are truly at loggerheads, it usually requires a third party adjudicator (often an arbitrator) to impose one of the options upon them.
- Cooling-off/Mediation. Not strictly a termination provision at all, many deadlock provisions 'end' by providing that the parties shall mediate until a solution is found (sometimes providing that if they cannot mediate out, the mediator will make a determination of reasonableness, which can then have knock-on effects under the contract). Whilst sounding like a 'soft' option, such clauses often represent the judgment of Solomon, as if the parties are unable to mediate the dispute out, then usually the enterprise will be dissolved.
- Deterrence approach. Often the termination clause in deadlock provisions provides a punitive element for the party initiating the deadlock procedure. In those clauses, a deadlock is only said to arise when one party serves a notice on the other indicating that a deadlock has arisen (instead of a failure to resolve on a key matter at a certain number of meetings). The provisions will then provide for the determination of the "fair market value" of a half share in the business, usually by having it valued by an expert or auditor (or sometimes both in consultation). Once the valuation is made, the party who served the notice must either (a) buy all the other party's share in the business at 125% of the fair price, or (b) sell its share to the other party at 75% of the fair price. The downside to such clauses is that deadlocks rarely get resolved, and can lead to the business being paralysed by indecision.
