= Pigi =

Pigi or Piyi may refer to:

- Pigi, Famagusta, a village in Cyprus
- Pigi, Rethymno, a village in Greece
- Pigi, Trikala, a village in Greece
- Pigi County, in South Sudan
- Hrysopiyi Devetzi, nicknamed Piyi, Greek athlete
- Piyi (crater), a crater on Mars
- Project I.G.I., or PIGI, a video game

== See also ==
- Piggy (disambiguation)
