= Piggybacking =

Piggyback, piggy-back, or piggybacking may mean:

== Transport ==
- Piggyback (transportation), something that is riding on the back of something else

== Art, entertainment, and media ==
- Splash cymbal piggybacking, mounting a cymbal on top of an already stand-mounted cymbal
- "Piggyback" (song), 2017 song by Melanie Martinez
- Chapter Nine: The Piggyback, 2022 episode of Stranger Things.

== Business, finance, and law ==
- Piggy-back (law), shareholder selling rights
- Piggybacking, a practice in which a person with bad credit uses the seasoned tradeline of credit of someone else

== Electronics ==
- Piggyback board, a daughterboard
- Piggyback microcontroller, a microcontroller variant with EPROM socket

== Healthcare ==
- Piggybacking, a second infusion set onto the same intravenous line using a Y-Set (intravenous therapy)
- "Piggy-back technique", is a technique in liver transplantation in which the recipient inferior vena cava is preserved.
- Vision Correction: The wearing of zero- or very-low-strength soft (daily disposable) contact lenses behind hard lenses if the hard lenses alone are uncomfortable or damaging to the cornea.

== Science ==
- Piggyback plant, Tolmiea menziesii
- Piggybacking, technique used in astrophotography
- PiggyBac transposon system, a type of transposable DNA element

== Security ==
- Piggybacking (security), when an authorized person allows (intentionally or unintentionally) others to pass through a secure door when they enter.

== Telecommunications ==
- Piggybacking (data transmission), a bi-directional data transmission technique in network layer, sending data along with ACK called Piggybacking
- Piggybacking (Internet access), obtaining wireless access by bringing one's own computer within the range of another subscriber's service
