= Eugen Kvaternik Square =

Square in Zagreb, Croatia

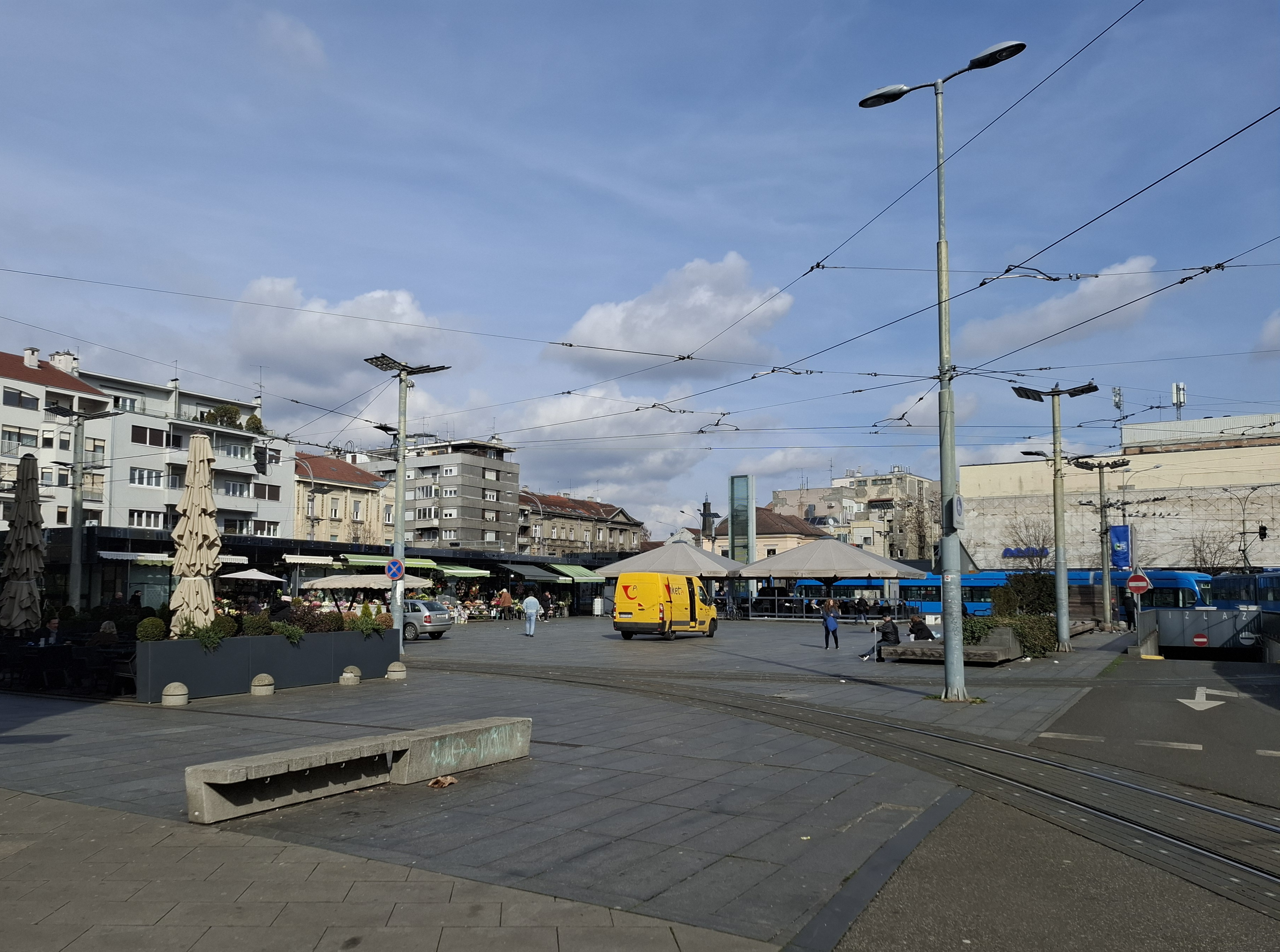
- Kvaternik Square, 2025
- Interactive map of Eugen Kvaternik Square
- Native name: Trg Eugena Kvaternika (Croatian)
- Coordinates: 45°48′53″N 15°59′50″E

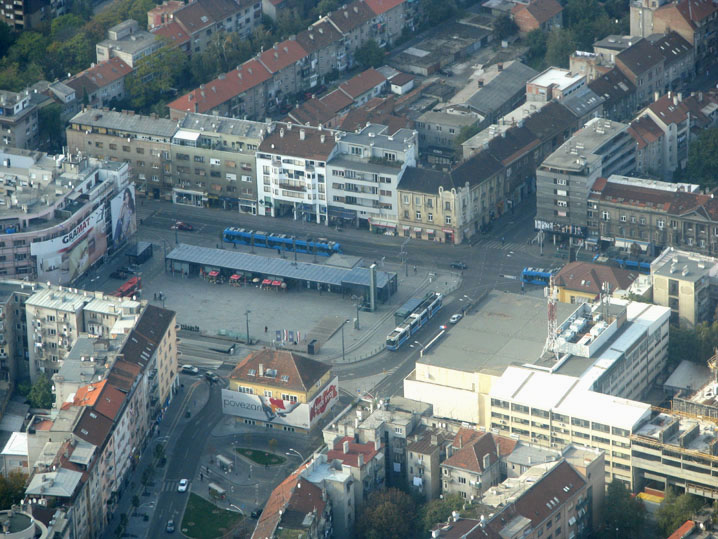
Eugen Kvaternik Square from the air (before the most recent redesign)

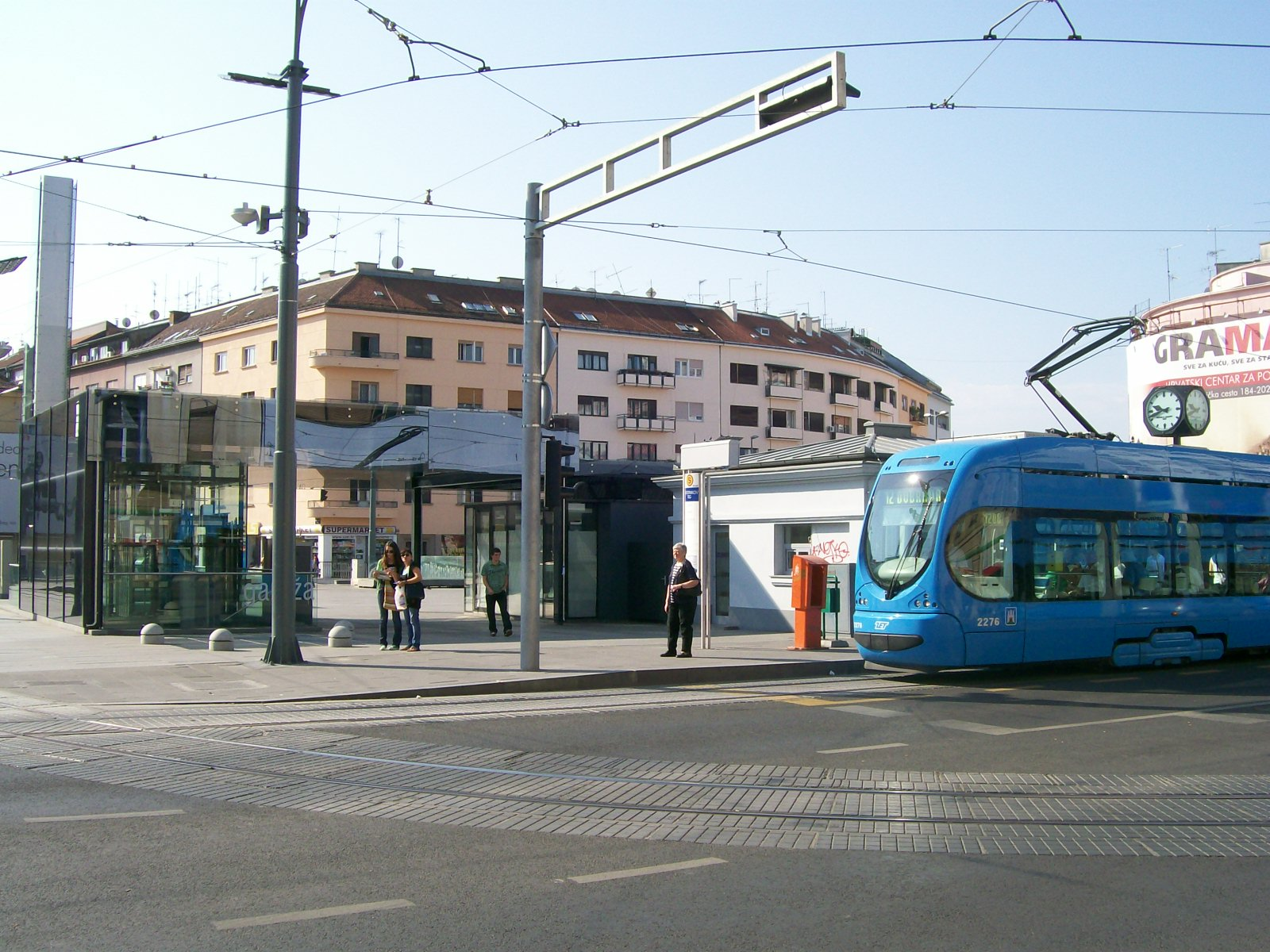
Intersection of Domjanićeva and Maksimirska Streets at the northeast corner of the square

Eugen Kvaternik Square (Croatian: Trg Eugena Kvaternika, also known as Kvaternikov trg or nicknamed Kvaternjak or Kvatrić by locals) is a square located on the border between Maksimir, Gornji Grad - Medveščak and Donji Grad city districts of Zagreb, Croatia. Named after Eugen Kvaternik, a 19th-century politician, it marks the intersection of Vlaška Street, Dragutin Domjanić Street, Maksimirska Street, Vjekoslav Heinzel Avenue, and Šubićeva Street.

Kvaternik Square is one of the most frequented squares in Zagreb. The square is a major transport hub within Zagreb, with ZET tram routes 4, 5, 7, 11, 12 and 13 traversing or terminating at the square. Numerous bus routes terminate at the Kvaternikov trg terminal which is located to the south of the square.

At the end of the 19th century, the end of the Vlaška street where Kvaternik Square is located was a location of numerous industries, and in 1891 it was the place where the first horse-drawn tram operated.

The square underwent a large renovation project in the 2000s. In 2001, the farmers' market part of the marketplace was moved to the south, to the corner of Šubićeva and Martićeva streets across the old Gorica factory. The square itself was then renovated and reopened in 2008. The renewed square incorporated an underground parking garage. However, the renewal has been met with resistance from nearby inhabitants for functional and aesthetic reasons. Criticism of the square's new design continued into the 2010s.
