= Voting interest =

Stockholders' voting power

Voting interest (or voting power) in business and accounting means the total number, or percent, of votes entitled to be cast on the issue at the time the determination of voting power is made, excluding a vote which is contingent upon the happening of a condition or event which has not occurred at the time.

Voting interest is one form of economic interest. Economic interests comprise all types and forms of investment vehicles that an investee could issue or be a party to, including equity securities; financial instruments with characteristics of equity, liabilities, or both; long-term debt and other debt-financing arrangements; leases; and contractual arrangements such as management contracts, service contracts, or intellectual property licenses.

== Non-voting interest ==
Ownership of more than 50% of voting shares generally gives the right of control and consolidation. In special cases, control is possible without having to own more than 50% of voting stock. For example, if agreed, shareholders may pass control to a chosen one owning much fewer shares (for example in the case of the two petroleum companies, MOL Group and INA - Industrija nafte).

In other cases, companies divide their stock into voting and non-voting classes, which can allow a small minority of shareholders to control a majority of the voting shares. This technique is often used to allow a company's founders to cash out much of their ownership without giving up control.

In the American media, dual-class structures caught on in the mid-20th century as families such as the Grahams of The Washington Post Company and the Ochs-Sulzbergers of The New York Times Company sought to gain access to public capital without losing control. Dow Jones & Company, publisher of The Wall Street Journal, had a similar structure and was controlled by the Bancroft family but was later bought by News Corporation in 2007, which itself is controlled by Rupert Murdoch and his family through a similar dual-class structure.

== Example ==
Company ABC issues 1,000,000 ordinary shares and 500,000 preferred shares outstanding.
Company XYZ buys 700,000 voting shares and 100,000 preferred ones.
Therefore, XYZ's voting interest is (700,000/1,000,000) = 70%, and its economic interest is (800,000/1,500,000) = 53%
