= Right of first refusal =

Contractual right to option to enter business transaction

Right of first refusal (ROFR or RFR) is a contractual right that gives its holder the option to enter a business transaction with the owner of something, according to specified terms, before the owner is entitled to enter into that transaction with a third party. A first refusal right must have at least three parties: the owner, the third party or buyer, and the option holder. In general, the owner must make the same offer to the option holder before making the offer to the buyer. The right of first refusal is similar in concept to a call option.

A ROFR can cover almost any sort of asset, including real estate, personal property, a patent license, a screenplay, or an interest in a business. It might also cover business transactions that are not strictly assets, such as the right to enter a joint venture or distribution arrangement. In entertainment, a right of first refusal on a concept or a screenplay would give the holder the right to make that movie first while in real estate, a right of first refusal would create incentive for the tenant to take better care of their leased apartment in case the opportunity to purchase arises in the future. Only if the holder turns it down may the owner then shop it around to other parties.

Because a ROFR is a contract right, the holder's remedies for breach are typically limited to recovery of damages. In other words, if the owner sells the asset to a third party without offering the holder the opportunity to purchase it first, the holder can then sue the owner for damages but may have a difficult time obtaining a court order to stop or reverse the sale. However, in some cases, the option becomes a property right that may be used to invalidate an improper sale.

ROFR also arises in visitation agreements/orders in divorce cases. In such cases, a ROFR may require a custodial parent to offer parenting time to the non-custodial parent (rather than having a child supervised by a third party) any time that the custodial parent or their family is unable to exercise their right to parenting time (such as if the custodial parent needs to travel out of town). Under these circumstances a breach may result in a finding of contempt and any remedies for contempt.

An ROFR differs from a right of first offer (ROFO, also known as a right of first negotiation) in that the ROFO merely obliges the owner to undergo exclusive good faith negotiations with the rights holder before negotiating with other parties. A ROFR is an option to enter a transaction on exact or approximate transaction terms. A ROFO is merely an agreement to negotiate.

== Examples ==
=== Right of first refusal ===
Alice owns a house which Bob offers to buy for $1 million. However, Carol (the third party) holds a right of first refusal. Therefore, before Alice can sell the house to Bob, she must first offer it to Carol for the $1 million that Bob is willing to buy it for. If Carol accepts, she buys the house instead of Bob. If Carol declines, Bob may now buy the house from Alice at the proposed $1 million price.

=== Right of first offer ===
Alice owns a house which she wishes to sell to Bob. However, Carol holds a right of first offer. Before Alice can negotiate with Bob, she must first enter into negotiations to sell the house to Carol. If they reach an agreement, Alice sells the house to Carol. Otherwise, Alice may negotiate with Bob. Typically, but not necessarily, the terms of the right of first offer restrict Alice's negotiations with Bob insofar as she has a limited time period to engage after an unsuccessful negotiation with Carol, and cannot offer more favourable terms than those offered to Carol.

== Variations ==
The following are all variations on the basic ROFR:

- Duration: The ROFR is limited in time. For example, Abe must make the offer to Carl for any proposed sale only in the first five years. After that, the right expires and Abe has no further obligation to Carl.
- Exceptions include certain transactions. Abe may sell or transfer the property to a holding company, a trust, family members, etc. without first offering it to Carl. However, the new owners remain subject to the right.
- Transferability: Carl may assign his ROFR to Dave. Abe must now offer Dave an option to purchase the property instead of Carl. Not every ROFR is transferable; some are personal to the original holder.
- Extinguished on first sale: if Abe sells the property to Bo because Carl declines the right, the property is no longer subject to the right. Bo may resell it free of the ROFR.
- Extinguished on declined/failed exercise: if Abe proposes to sell the property to Bo and Carl declines, or if Carl accepts but is unable to complete the transaction, the right is extinguished whether or not Abe ultimately sells the property.
- Persistent: in contrast to the above two, in this case, the right runs with the property and binds the new purchaser. If Abe sells the property to Bo, Bo must offer the property to Carl first, just like Abe if Bo wishes to re-sell it.
- Offer and acceptance terms: specific deadlines, procedures, and forms may be required. For example, Abe must give Carl a "notice of sale." Carl has 30 days to accept or reject, with failure to respond counting as rejection. Carl must then close the transaction within that time, or that counts as a failed attempt to exercise.
- Limited time period to close transaction: Abe offers the property to Carl under the ROFR, and Carl declines. Abe now has 60 days to close the transaction with Bo. If it cannot close within 60 days, Abe must offer it again to Carl before proceeding further with Bo.
- Substitute purchaser allowed: Abe offers the property to Carl, who declines. Abe is then free to sell it to Bo but fails to do so. Abe may sell the property under the same terms to Erin instead without reoffering it to Carl.
- No pending transaction required: Abe wishes to sell the house for $1 million but has not yet identified a purchaser. He prepares proposed sales terms and offers it to Carl on those terms. If Carl declines, Abe may then shop around for a purchaser.
- Slight variations allowed in exercise: Abe enters an agreement with Bo calling for Bo to put down a 30% down payment, conduct certain inspections, and close the transaction in 20 days. He offers it to Carl at those terms. Carl accepts but is entitled to insist on a 20% down payment and a 30-day closing period.
- Slight variations allowed in sale: Abe offers the house for $1 million to Carl, who declines. Abe then enters a transaction with Bo but during the escrow, Bo discovers a flaw in title and several defects. Abe is entitled to discount the price by $20,000 to close the sale with Bo without having to reoffer the house to Carl at $980,000.
- Continuous: a continuous right of first refusal can be worded to continue to live, even upon infinite opportunities that are declined.

Further variations are possible. A fully drafted ROFR addresses all of the salient issues and more, and in the case of valuable and/or complex transactions is subject to negotiation and review by business transaction attorneys. Even the best drafted such ROFRs are at a high risk of dispute and litigation inasmuch as they anticipate future transactions and contingencies which are unknowable when the ROFR is signed. However, many ROFRs are not so completely specified, and need not be, the circumstances being so routine and the transaction such that that boilerplate suffices.

== In venture capital ==
In venture capital deals, the right of first refusal is a term sheet provision permitting existing investors in a company to accept or refuse the purchase of equity shares offered by the company, before third parties have access to the deal. The main goal of the provision is to allow investors to prevent ownership dilution as the company raises additional capital. Typically, the provision will exempt certain types of shares, such as those in an employee pool, or shares issued to equipment loaners or lessors. Startup companies are advised to attempt negotiating out this right, because it enables existing investors to send stronger (potentially negative) signals to new investors, and consequently drive down the company's valuation.

== See also ==
- Drag-along right
- First-look deal
- Option (finance)
- Pre-emption right
- Tag-along right
