= Piggy-back (law) =

Legal agreement on shareholder rights

Piggy-back applies to contractual agreements in law, more specifically shareholder selling rights. To apply, a piggy-back clause must be included in a corporation's shareholder agreement, which is part of the incorporation materials.

Because the shareholder's agreement is a contract, the rules are rather soft, and a piggyback clause can be tailored to fit the specific needs of the company. Generally, a piggyback clause applies only to a majority shareholder or someone with a large portion of the shares. The clause will come into effect when that person decides to sell all or a significant part (the percentage can be decided upon in the convention) of their shares to a third party (who may or may not be a shareholder). Should this person, or group of people, decide to sell their shares, the other shareholders can 'piggy-back' into the original shareholders offer to the third party, and offer to sell their shares to the third party for the same agreed upon price.

The third party can then only buy the shares of the majority shareholder if he agrees to purchase all the shares of all other shareholders who wish to be bought out. In practice, however, if the majority shareholder decides to disregard the piggy-back clause, the other shareholders cannot (depending on different provinces or states) cancel the transaction, but have a recourse in damages against the seller.

There are two modalities of a piggy-back clause which can be observed in distinct situations. A piggy-back clause may take the form of either a "tag-along", or as a "drag-along". "Tag-along" will be observed in a situation where minority shareholders will attach themselves to a majority shareholder's sale of shares to a third party; they tag-along with the sale of the latter. A "drag-along" will be observed where a majority shareholder will oblige minority shareholders to sell their shares at the same time to a third party; the latter are dragged in to the sale of shares of the former.

For example, say Abe owns 55% of Widgets Inc., and wants to sell his shares to Bill for $55. Chuck owns 2 shares of Widgets Inc. He does not like the looks of Bill, so he wants to piggy-back in on the deal, and sell his shares too. The shareholder agreement includes a piggy-back agreement. Chuck notifies both Abe and Bill in writing of his intentions. Bill must now buy both Abe's and Chuck's shares in the company.

== Piggy-back (law-government contracts) ==
Piggy-back or piggybacking also applies to contracts issued by individual governmental entities that allow other jurisdictions to use the contract (i.e., to “piggyback” on the contract terms and prices) they established. The contracting jurisdiction must include piggyback language in the contract, and the vendor must agree. Piggyback contracts represent the most immediate cooperative purchasing resource, especially for smaller communities. However, they can be a benefit for larger communities by saving administrative costs and by creating pressure for lower prices. Some entities do not have statutory authority to piggyback.
