= Zsolt Hernádi =

Hungarian businessman (born 1960)

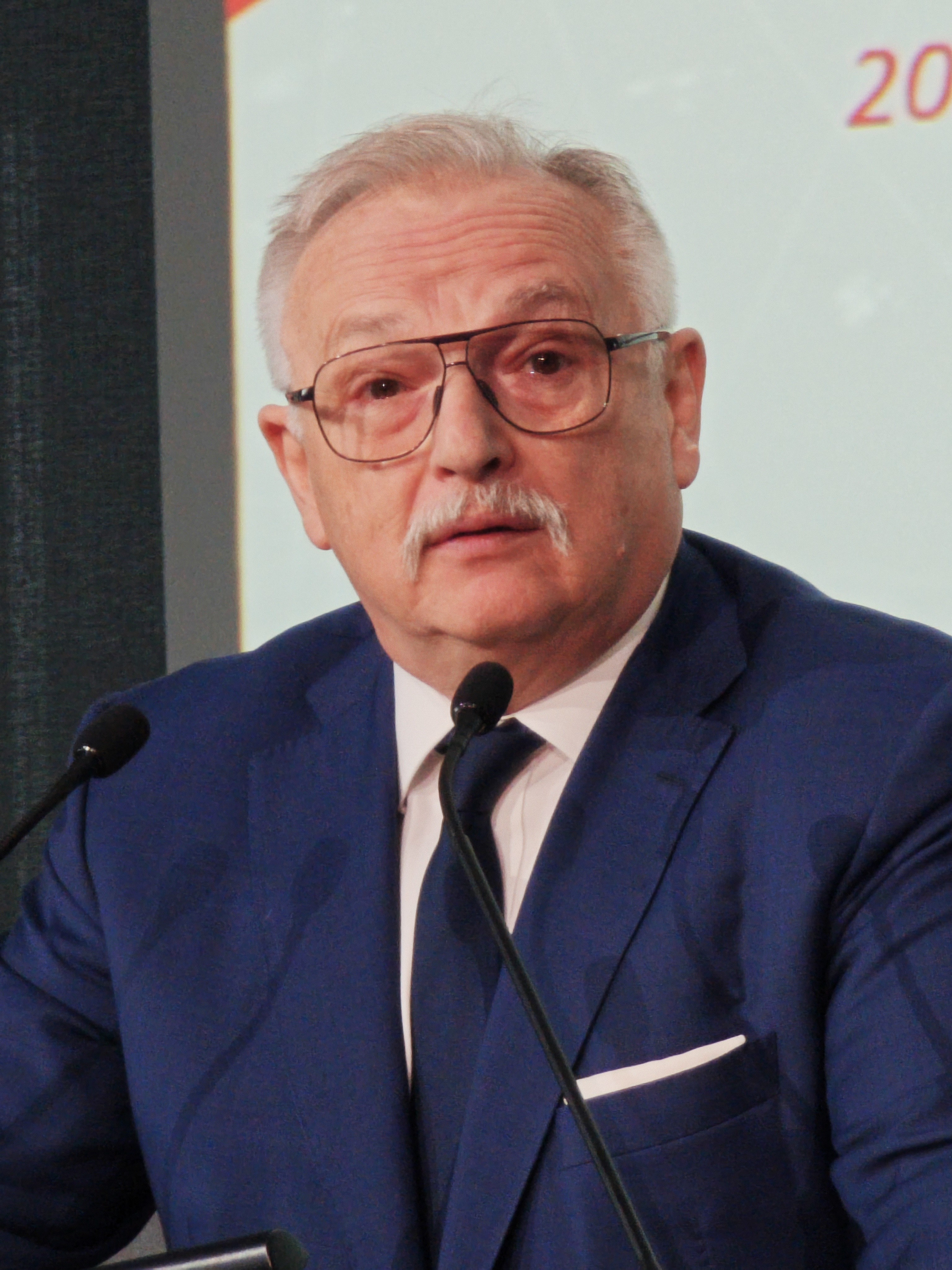
- Hernádi in 2026
- Born: 30 November 1960 (age 65); Tarján, Hungary
- Education: Karl Marx University
- Known for: CEO, MOL Group

Zsolt Hernádi (born 30 November 1960) is a Hungarian businessman and the Chairman-CEO of MOL Plc., the Hungarian Oil & Gas company, since 2001. He previously served as CEO of the Magyar Takarékszövetkezeti Bank from 1994 to 2001.

== Early life and education ==
Zsolt Hernádi was born in Tarján on 30 November 1960. He grew up in Esztergom, where he spent his student years. First he was a student of Kossuth Lajos Elementary School, then he graduated from the mathematics department of the Dobó Katalin High School. Hernádi graduated from the Faculty of Industrial Planning and Analysis at the Corvinus University of Budapest (with a degree in economics) in 1986. As a freshly graduated student he became a trainee at Deutsche Bank in Germany.

== Career ==
Zsolt Hernádi started his professional career at Unicbank and subsequently held various positions at the Kereskedelmi és Hitelbank (K&H) between 1989 and 1994, becoming Deputy general manager in 1992. Between 1994 and 2001, Hernádi then served as the CEO of the Magyar Takarékszövetkezeti Bank (Takarékbank).

== MOL ==
Hernádi joined MOL in 1999. He has been a member of MOL's board of directors since February 1999. In July 2000, he was elected chairman of the board and has served as chairman-CEO of MOL since 11 June 2001. Under Hernádi's leadership, MOL developed from a local Hungarian company to an international company in the oil and gas industry, with the firm's earnings growing seven-fold from $2.1 to $15.1 billion and market capitalization multiplying five-fold from $2.2 (data from December 2002) to $9.7 billion (data from January 2019). With Hernádi, the company has also adopted a new strategy, MOL Group 2030, built on the premise that demand for hydrocarbon-based motor fuels will gradually decline in the long run and with it is considered one of the first movers among the industry peers to acknowledge the expected weakening dominance of fossil fuels.

During a hostile takeover attempt of MOL by OMV in 2007 and 2008, Hernádi was credited with playing a critical role in defending the company and securing MOL's independence.

== Controversies ==
In 2011, Croatia started an investigation of ex-prime minister Ivo Sanader for allegedly accepting a €10 million bribe from MOL in exchange for the Croatian Government approving the First Amendment to the Shareholders Agreement and thus MOL securing management rights, also accusing the company's chairman Hernádi.

MOL repeatedly denied all the accusation. Soon after, the Hungarian prosecution launched an extensive investigation on suspicion of bribery and in 2012 dismissed all allegations of any criminal activity.

In 2014, the Croatian government initiated arbitration under UNCITRAL rules, seeking nullification of the First Amendment to the Shareholder's Agreement, claiming that MOL unlawfully obtained management rights. In 2016, UNCITRAL rejected all of Croatia's claims and cleared MOL of all accusations, including allegation of bribery and breaching the shareholder agreement. This was further confirmed by the Swiss Supreme Court. On 20 December 2019, the Zagreb County Court issued a first instance ruling in the Sander-Hernádi case, judging that the CEO of MOL was guilty of bribery and sentenced him to two years in prison. MOL Group declared its disappointment with the judgement “as the existing decisions of the Hungarian authorities and those of the United Nations Tribunal in Geneva concluded that there was no wrongdoing by any MOL Group officer”. MOL declared full support of its board for Hernádi. The Hungarian government qualified the condemnation of Hernádi as political pressure. Two international legal scholars, Kai Ambos and David Anderson, Baron Anderson of Ipswich were appointed to independently monitor the fairness of the court case. The trial monitors accused the Croatian court of "bias" in support of Croatian "national interests" and violating internationally-recognised standards of fair trial, "including violating Article 6(1) of the European Convention on Human Rights (ECHR)." On 29 January 2020, the same Zagreb court overturned its 2018 detention order against Hernádi. The decision, which can be appealed by Croatia's chief prosecutor, could lead to a cancellation of the European arrest warrant for Hernádi and his removal from an Interpol wanted list.

=== MOL received compensation after winning its legal dispute with Croatia ===
In the complex and lengthy disagreement involving MOL and INA, the International Centre for Settlement of Investment Disputes (ICSID) based in Washington ruled in favor of MOL. The dispute originated in 2013 when MOL initiated an arbitration case, alleging that Croatia had not fulfilled its contractual obligations. This marked the second time Croatia had found itself on the losing side of an arbitration case with MOL. The first instance was in 2014, with an award of €14.5 million granted by a Swiss court.

With the ICSID ruling, MOL was practically declared the winner of the arbitration dispute against Croatia, and compensation in the amount of $250–300 million was given to MOL. This sum is far lower than MOL's initial claim of $1 billion. Additionally, the court dismissed Croatia's allegations of corruption against MOL, where the Hungarian company was accused of obtaining managerial control over INA through illicit means.

The ICSID decision highlighted Croatia's breach of contract, notably with regard to issues like gas trade regulation and natural gas pricing. This disregard for the law significantly harmed INA and, inadvertently, MOL. Further compensation was granted to MOL due to the compelled sale of stored natural gas by an INA subsidiary at lower prices.

Zdravko Maric, the Croatian Finance Minister, submitted his resignation after the ICSID's decision, claiming personal reasons. It remains unclear, though, exactly how his departure relates to the court's decision.

The ICSID decision is an important turning point in the prolonged legal fight between MOL and Croatia and a significant shift in their tumultuous history.

=== Croatia's request for review was denied by the Swiss court ===
In a related matter, opposition parties within the Croatian parliament were disappointment following the Swiss Federal Supreme Court's decision to reject Croatia's application for a review of the 2016 INA arbitration case. Ivo Sanader and Zsolt Tamas Hernádi were found guilty of bribery in a judgment that was upheld by the Croatian Supreme Court in February 2022, at the time when a request for a review was made.

Significant differences in the testimony of various people, most notably Robert Jezic, influenced the Swiss court's ruling. This outcome drew frustration among Croatian officials, with MP Dalija Oreskovic (Centre) asserting that the situation highlighted the nation's vulnerability and the potential inadequacy of its representation.

Some MPs contended that the Swiss Federal Supreme Court's verdict indicated concerns about the independence of Croatia's judiciary. Nikola Grmoja (Most party) suggested that the outcome of the INA case influenced the arbitration's result and the subsequent review request. He raised concerns about systemic flaws within Croatia's judicial system, casting doubt on the notion of an impartial judiciary.

The Croatian Democratic Union (HDZ) government's activities should be closely scrutinized, Grmoja said in addition to highlighting the necessity for specificity while discussing the demands made by the Hungarian corporation MOL. Notably, just one of MOL's previous arbitration attempts had succeeded in satisfying any of the six demands, which raised questions about the specifics of their demands

== Awards and recognitions ==
Hernádi was declared an Honorary Freeman of the city of Esztergom in 2007 and in September 2009, he was named Honorary Professor of Budapest Corvinus University. In 2010, Hernádi was honored with the Hungarian Order of Merit – Commander's Cross with Star of the Republic of Hungary, as a recognition for his efforts in diversifying and improving the security of supply in Central and Eastern Europe as well as his contribution to the development of MOL. In 2016, he was named the Honorary Citizen of the city of Százhalombatta and in 2017, was appointed as a member of the National Competitiveness Council in Hungary. In 2018, Zsolt Hernádi received the Titular University Professor title from Budapest Corvinus University.

According to the Influence Barometer he is the 13th most influential person in Hungary in 2020.

In 2021, the Budapest Stock Exchange awarded Hernádi the “Lifetime Achievement Award for the Development of the Hungarian Capital Market”, while Mol Nyrt. was awarded the “Responsibility, Sustainability and Responsible Corporate Governance Award”.
