= Associate company =

Concept in accounting on voting shares ownership

An associate company (or associate) in accounting and business valuation is a company in which another company owns a significant portion of voting shares, usually 20–50%. In this case, an owner does not consolidate the associate's financial statements. Ownership of over 50% creates a subsidiary, with its financial statements being consolidated into the parent's books. Associate value is reported in the balance sheet as an asset, the investor's proportional share of the associate's income is reported in the income statement and dividends from the ownership decrease the value on the balance sheet. In Europe, investments into associate companies are called fixed financial assets.

Associate value in the enterprise value equation is the reciprocate of minority interest.

Under the UK Companies Act 2006, two companies are "associated" if one company is a subsidiary of the other or both are subsidiaries of the same body corporate.

== Advantages ==
The advantages are that knowledge and resources are shared and do not have to be fully acquired, thus reducing risk and expenses. The investing company can leverage the market expertise, technologies, or distribution channels of the associate, and it can spread its risk around. The parent company can help the associate gain access to capital, strategic direction and credibility to help grow. This is also possible because the structure of this inter-company cooperation opens the door for flexibility in international expansion and risk sharing.

== Disadvantages ==
Investors and regulators tend to be critical towards overly complex structure of associate companies. The parent company may fail to provide a fair and accurate view of the associate’s financial standing, creating a misleading representation of the parent's financial standing.
