= Šubićeva Street =

Street in Zagreb, Croatia

- Interactive map of Šubićeva Street
- Coordinates: 45°48′31″N 15°59′30″E

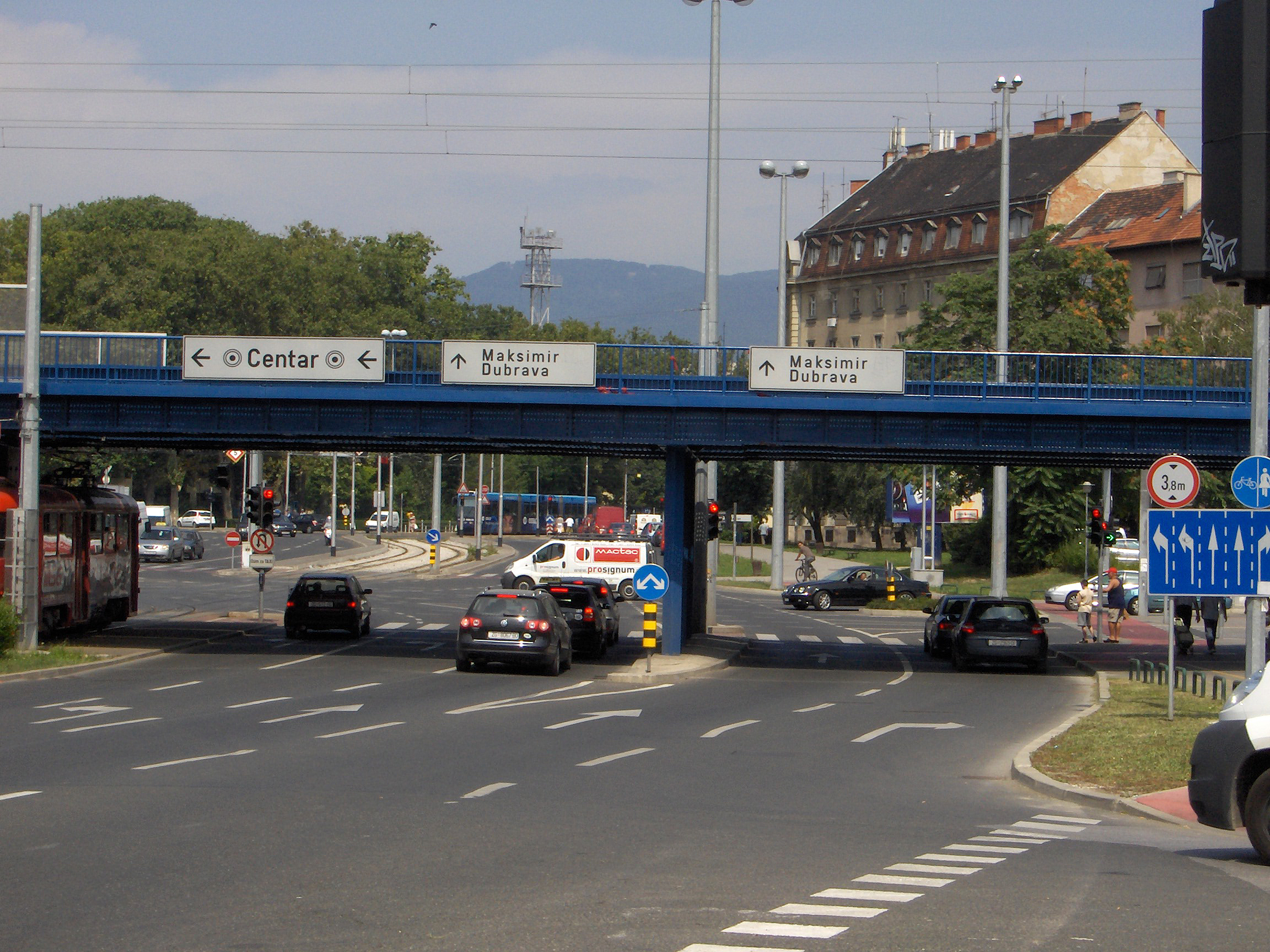
Southern end of Šubićeva looking north at Petar Krešimir IV Square. A railway overpass can be seen.

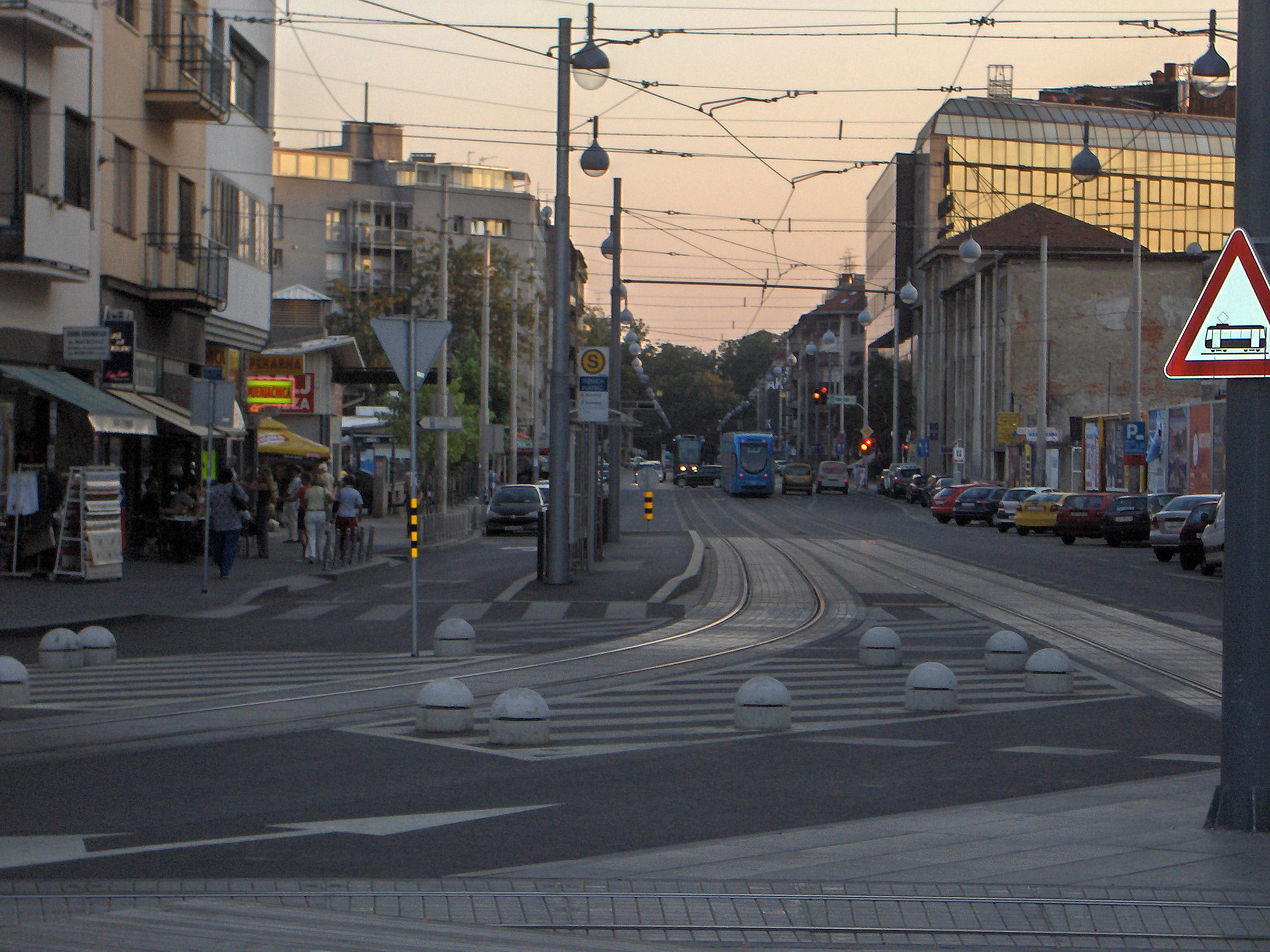
Northern end of Šubićeva looking south from Eugen Kvaternik Square

Šubićeva Street (Croatian: Ulica Pavla Šubića, Šubićeva ulica, named after Pavao Šubić) is a street in Zagreb, Croatia. It connects Eugen Kvaternik Square with Petar Krešimir IV Square. It is located in the Zagreb district of Donji grad. Šubićeva Street is four-lane in its entire length with tram tracks between the roadways. Due to the tram tracks left-turns are forbidden at some intersections. The street intersects Vjekoslav Heinzel Avenue and Maksimirska Street at the Kvaternik Square, Zvonimirova Street, and Branimirova Avenue at the Petar Krešimir IV Square. As it passes the square, it changes its name to Marin Držić Avenue.

== Sources ==
- Bilić, Josip; Ivanković, Hrvoje, eds. (2006). "Šubićeva ulica (Ul. Pavla Šubića)". Zagrebački leksikon (in Croatian). Zagreb: Miroslav Krleža Institute of Lexicography and Masmedia. ISBN 953-157-486-3.
