= Pre-emption right =

Right to acquire property before any other acquirers

A pre-emption right, right of pre-emption, or first option to buy is a contractual right to acquire certain property newly coming into existence before it can be offered to any other person or entity. It comes from the Latin verb emo, emere, emi, emptum, to buy or purchase, plus the inseparable preposition pre, before. A right to acquire existing property in preference to any other person is usually referred to as a right of first refusal.

== Company shares ==
In practice, the most common form of pre-emption right is the right of existing shareholders to acquire new shares issued by a company in a rights issue, usually a public offering. In this context, the pre-emptive right is also called subscription right or subscription privilege. It is the right but not the obligation of existing shareholders to buy the new shares before they are offered to the public. In that way, existing shareholders can maintain their proportional ownership of the company and thus prevent stock dilution. In many jurisdictions, subscription rights are automatically provided for by statute, such as in the United Kingdom, but in other jurisdictions, there arise only if provided for under the constitutional documents of the relevant company. In the United States, for example, it is rare for publicly listed companies to grant pre-emptive rights to shareholders, but it is common for unlisted companies to grant pre-emptive rights to venture capital and private equity investors. The European Union has brought an infringement action against Spain based on the claim that the lack of statutory pre-emptive rights under Spanish law violates the Second Company Law Directive.

Other situations in which pre-emption rights are seen to arise are in property developments. Parties close to the investors are often given a right of pre-emption in relation to new flats or condominiums within a development.

Overall, pre-emption right is similar to the concept of a call option.

=== British companies ===
The Companies Act 2006 is the source of shareholder pre-emption rights in British companies. Under Section 561(1) of the Companies Act 2006 a company must not issue shares to any person unless it has made an offer (on the same or on more favourable terms) to each person who already holds shares in the company in the proportion held by them, and the time limit given to the shareholder to accept the offer has expired.

By virtue of Section 562(5), the period given to the shareholders to accept such an offer must not be less than 14 days.

Those provisions' effect is that a company cannot allot shares to new shareholders until it has offered them to its existing shareholders. The company must give the shareholders at least 14 days to decide whether or not they wish to purchase the shares. Private companies and sometimes public companies can choose to disapply or modify the statutory pre-emption rights either generally or in respect of a specific allotment (Sections 569 to 573 of the Companies Act 2006).

== Historic meanings ==
Under international law, the right of preemption formerly referred to the right of a nation to detain merchandise passing through its territories or seas to afford to its subjects the preference of purchase. That form of right was sometimes regulated by treaty. A 1794 treaty between the United States and Great Britain agreed:

whereas the difficulty of agreeing on precise cases in which alone provisions and other articles not generally contraband may be regarded as such, renders it expedient to provide against the inconveniences and misunderstandings which might thence arise. It is further agreed that whenever any such articles so being contraband according to the existing laws of nations, shall for that reason be seized, the same shall not be confiscated, but the owners thereof shall be speedily and completely indemnified; and the captors, or in their default-the government under whose authority they act, shall pay to the masters or owners of such vessel the full value of all articles, with a reasonable mercantile profit thereon, together with the freight, and also the damages incident to such detention.

In the 18th-century United States, when an individual bought the preemption right to land, he did not buy the land but only the right to buy the land. In the case of the Phelps and Gorham Purchase, the syndicate paid Massachusetts $1,000,000 for the pre-emptive rights, and then paid the Indians, who thought they owned the land, $5,000 cash, and an annual $500 annuity forever for their title to the land.

== See also ==
- Drag-along right
- First-look deal
- Follow-on offering
- Option contract
- Preemption Act of 1841 (U.S. land transfers)
- Right of first refusal
- Rights issue
- Tag-along right
