= INA d.d. =

Croatian multinational oil company

INA-Industrija nafte, d.d.
- Type: Public
- Traded as: ZSE: INA
- Industry: Oil and gas
- Founded: 1 January 1964
- Headquarters: Zagreb, Croatia
- Key people: Zsuzsanna Éva Ortutay (chair); Zsombor Ádám Marton; Károly Hazuga; Hrvoje Šimović; Marin Zovko; Hrvoje Šimović; Hrvoje Milić
- Revenue: ▼€3.83 billion (2025)
- Operating income: ▼€181.89 million (2025)
- Net income: ▼€152.30 million (2025)
- Total assets: ▲€3.49 billion (2025)
- Number of employees: INA d.d.: 2,907 (2025); INA Group: 9,319 (2025)
- Website: www.ina.hr

INA-Industrija nafte, d.d. is a Croatian multinational oil company headquartered in Zagreb. INA Group has a leading role in Croatia's oil business, including oil and gas exploration, production, processing and distribution. INA is a stock company whose main shareholders are the Hungarian MOL Group (49%) and the Croatian Government (45%), with the rest owned by private and institutional investors. INA shares have been listed both on the London stock exchange and Zagreb stock exchange since 1 December 2006. INA Group is composed of several affiliated companies wholly or partially owned by INA, d.d.

== History ==
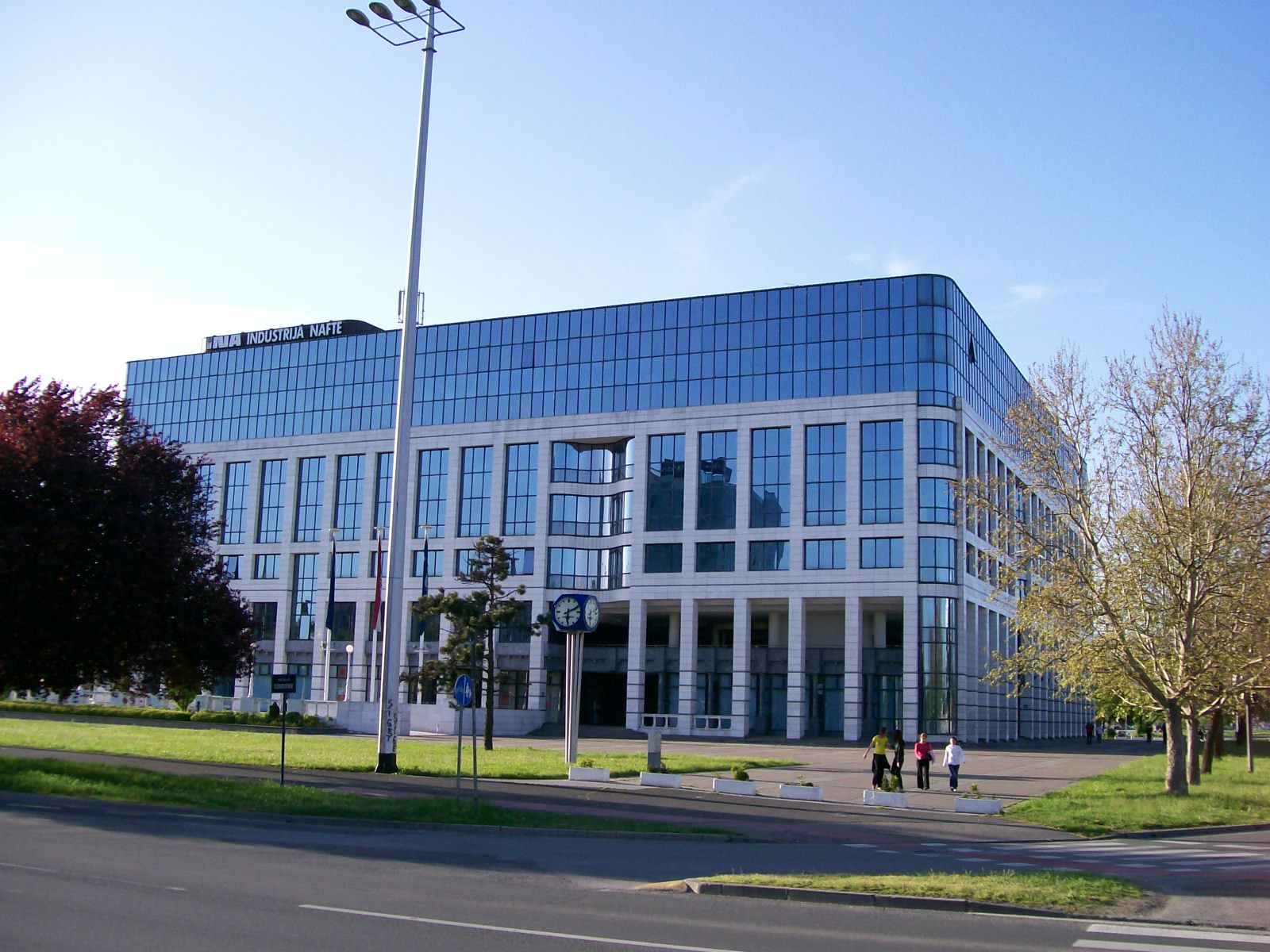
INA headquarters in Zagreb

INA was established on 1 January 1964 through the merger of Naftaplin (company for oil and gas exploration and production) with the refineries in Rijeka and Sisak. Initially, the company was called "Oil and Gas Conglomerate" but on 26 November its name was changed to the one it has today. In 1990, INA became a state-owned company and in 1993 a joint stock company. The first stage of its privatization was in 2003 when MOL became INA’s strategic partner by purchasing 25% of the shares. 7% of the shares were transferred to the Croatian Defenders’ Fund in 2005. After selling 7% of the shares to former and current INA employees, ownership structure of the company was changed and now less than 50% of total shares lie in state ownership. In this sense, the Croatian Government and MOL have signed the First Amendments to the Shareholders Agreement. In October 2008, MOL‘s voluntary public takeover offer to INA – INDUSTRIJA NAFTE d.d. shareholders was finalized. MOL has increased its ownership to 47, 16% by transferring shares stored during voluntary public offer and by paying off funds to shareholders. Subsequent doubts over legality of the acquisition in light of the Ivo Sanader corruption case led to the INA-MOL dispute, ultimately resolved in favor of MOL before the United Nations Commission on International Trade Law.

== Upstream ==
Until now, INA has been involved in exploration and production operations in Croatia (Pannonian basin, Adriatic offshore) and 20 foreign countries. Today INA operates its exploration and production activities in Croatia, Egypt and Angola. In exploration and production, as the primary initiator of company’s development, in the future INA plans to follow development strategy based on research, development of existing projects and the potential action of non-organic steps. The Company is focused on 100% reserves replacement and maintenance of production level of approximately 70,000 boe per day.

== Downstream ==
INA has two fuel refineries, located in Rijeka (Urinj) and Sisak. The refinery in Rijeka is located on shore, allowing access to the port for deep-drawing ships and the pipeline system of JANAF. More than HRK 54 billion is invested in the refinery system development in the last few years. In Rijeka refinery three facilities within Hydrocracking complex were built – Mild hydrocracking, Hydrogen unit and Desulphurization plant (Claus) as well as numerous supporting facilities and installations. The facilities are in commercial work from May 2011. In February 2014 a contract on basic design for the Delayed Coking Unit for Rijeka Refinery was signed with the company Bechtel Hydrocarbon Technical Solutions (BHTS). INA completed the upgrade in March 2026 for a reported cost of $820 million, which was the company's largest single investment. In Sisak refinery three plants have been completed: desulphurization plant, the so-called Claus the hydrodesulphurization of FCC gasoline plant and Isomerization plant. Furthermore, from mid-2013 Sisak Refinery has the possibility of production of diesel fuels with bio component and in the same year in September a system of additional wastewater treatment KROFTA was put into operation, while in April 2014 the installation of new coke chambers was carried out at the Coking plant. In April 2024, INA signed contracts for a green hydrogen plant at the Rijeka refinery and a bio methane production facility in Sisak. The projects are expected to be completed in 2026 with a value of $104 million.

== Retail ==
As of 2019, INA managed a regional network of 500 petrol stations in Croatia and neighboring countries.

== Rijeka refinery ==
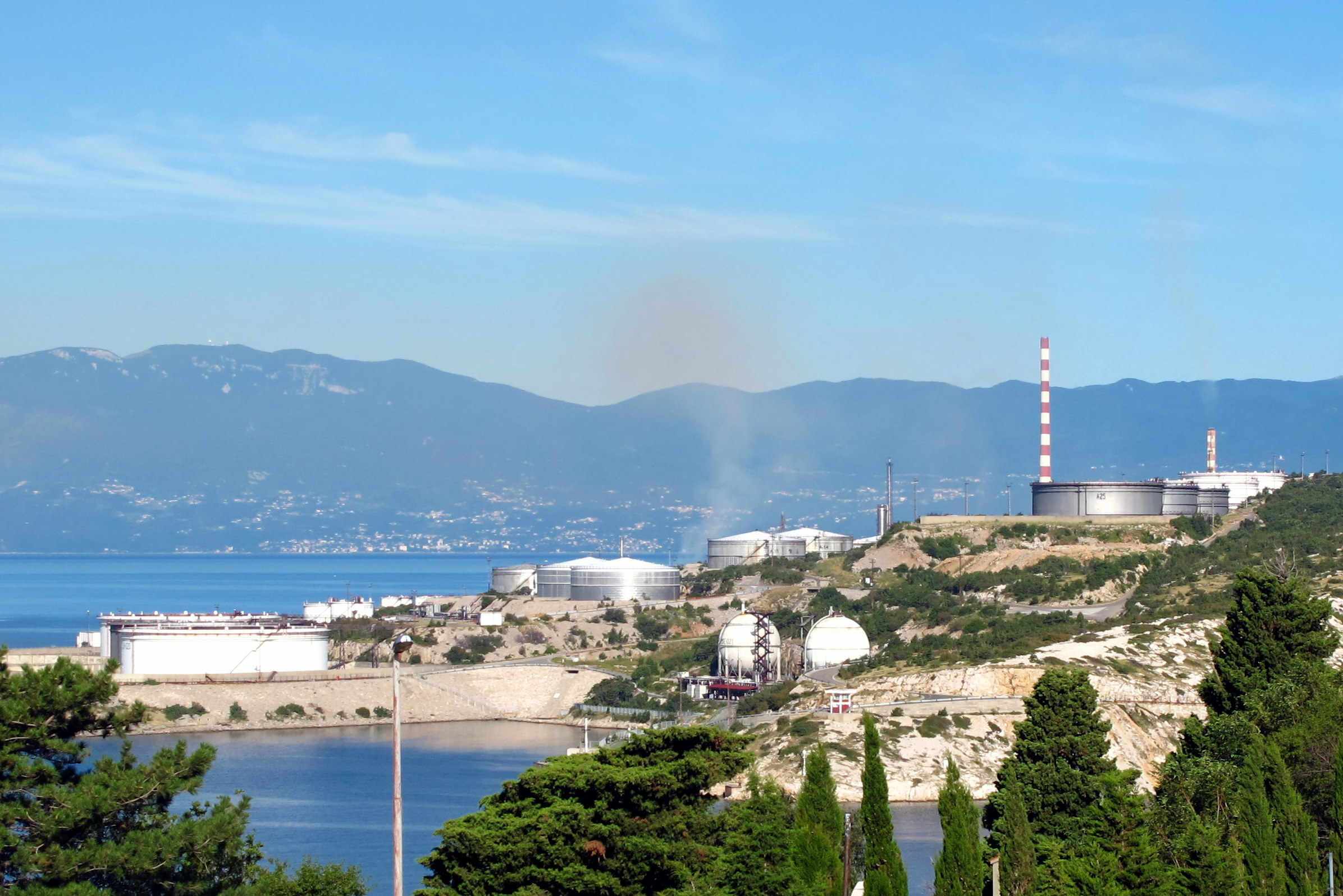
Rijeka refinery

INA is the operator of Rijeka oil refinery which is located in the region Bakar at the entrance to Bay of Bakar.

Rijeka's oil refinery was founded 1883 in the district Mlaka. It began its production with 300 staff members was and with its capacity of 60,000 tons per annum the biggest refinery on the European continent. After World War I Rijeka became part of the Kingdom of Italy and the refinery became an important part of the Italian oil program. 1922 its name was changed to Raffineria di Oli Minerali S.A. From 1926 onwards the refinery was the first industrial enterprise of the Italian Agip. When World War II started the refinery had a capacity of 120000 tons. When the war ended Rijeka belonged to Yugoslavia. The destroyed refinery was rebuilt and was enlarged by another factory in Urinj. Lubricants were produced in Urinj and fuels were produced in Mlaka. By 1965 the refinery had a capacity of 8 million tons per annum.

In the 1960s, as part of Rijeka's harbor extension the mineral-oil-port was moved to the bay of Omišalj on the island Krk (JANAF). A 7,2 km long and 20 inches thick pipeline led from there to Rijeka's refinery. The refinery is located 12 km south of the city and comprises an area of 3,5 square km in the districts Kostrena and Bakar. It is reachable via ship, street and railway.

In the 1980s the refinery produced 250 different oil products including the country's first unleaded fuel in 1984.

In March 2026, a delayed coking unit as well as further facilities were completed, with total production expected to increase by 30%.

The refinery has its own port, wharfs and offshore establishments to provide transport of goods, raw oil, petroleum products and petrolium-derivatives. The following products are being produced at the INA-refinery: liquefied petroleum gas, naphtha, Motor fuel, jet fuel, diesel fuel, heating oil, asphalt, coke, sulfur, lubricant, grease and paraffin wax.

== Sisak refinery ==
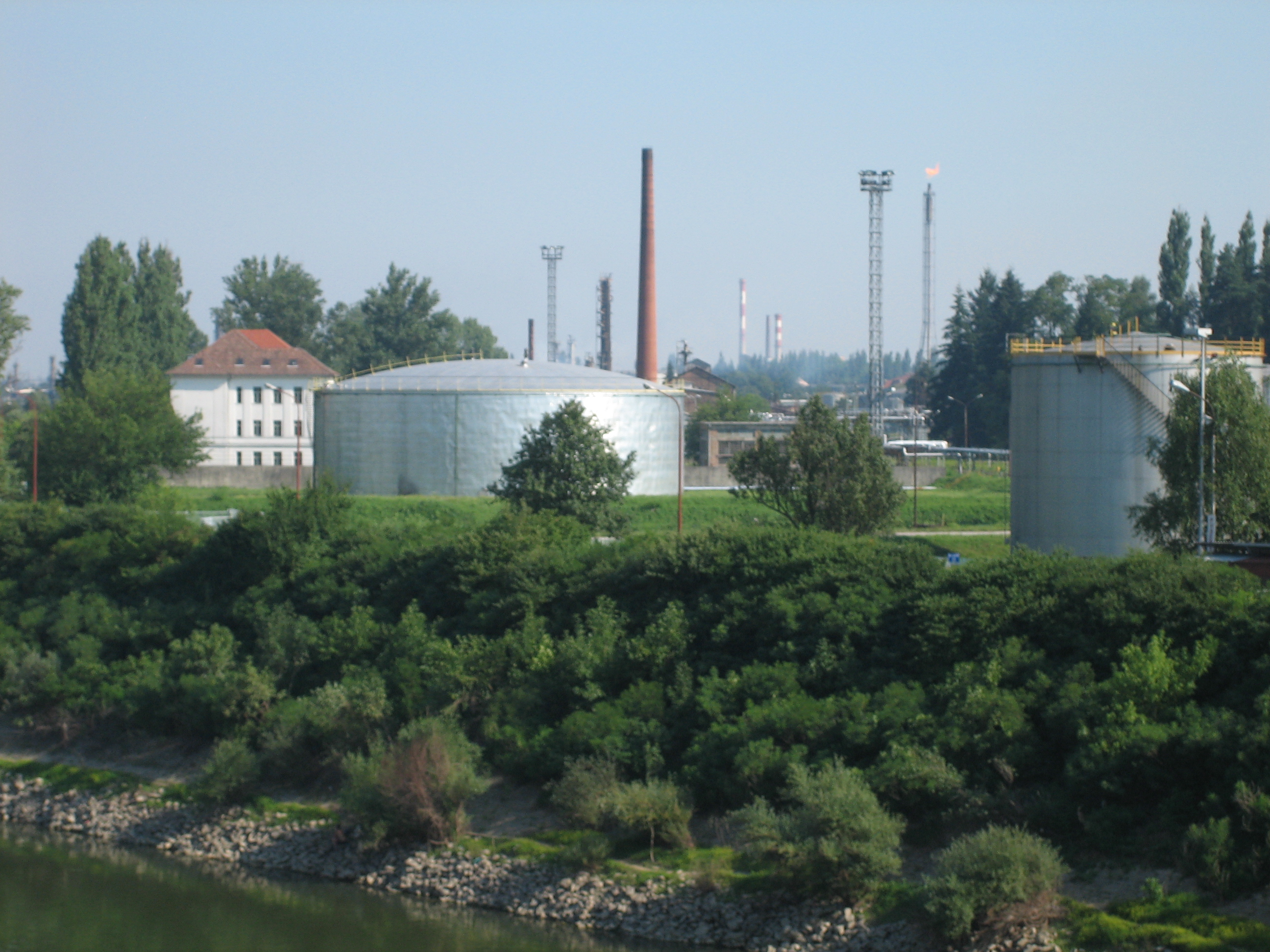
Sisak oil refinery

INA runs a second refinery in Sisak directly where the river Kupa joins the river Sava. The refinery's history began in 1923 when Royal Dutch Shell established an oil storage. In 1928 Shell extended the storage by building the first refinery system. The refinery had a capacity of 170 tons per day. In 1940 the processing of local raw oil began. The refinery was majorly damaged in World War II. The production continued in September 1945 after the war had ended and reached its prewar production level in 1949. From 1956 to 1964 the production facilities were extended and the refinery's capacity rose to 1 million tons per year. Until the mid-1980s the refinery's capacity continued to grow up to 6.5 million tons per year.

During the Croatian War of Independence from 1991 to 1995 the battlefront was only a few kilometers away from the refinery. Due to this circumstance the production facilities were destroyed. When the refinery was reconstructed at the end of the war it was modernized.

In September 2014 plans were announced that INA wanted to close the refinery in Sisak. However, in October 2014 the INA supervisory board decided to postpone the closure.

== Finances ==
The following table shows the main financial indicators of the INA Group for the period from 2005-2021, based on the yearly financial reports. The exchange rate from Croatian kuna to United States dollar was taken from the official site of the Croatian National Bank. Since the takeover by MOL Group in late 2008, the revenue of the INA Group has been gradually decreasing from a record 5.767 billion USD in 2008 to 3.672 billion in 2021 (36.34% decrease). Two contributing factors were the effects of the 2008 financial crisis and the loss of a total of six oil and gas fields in Syria due the Sanctions against Syria imposed by the EU as a response to the Syrian civil war. Close to one billion USD was invested by INA in the Syrian project, which was contributing 780 million USD a year in revenue. In October 2014, fighters of the Islamic State seized two of the six oil and gas fields. According to an interview with Davor Štern in 2021, who was the Minister of Economy, Labour and Entrepreneurship in the Croatian Government and head of the supervisory board of INA at the time, there is currently no interest by the MOL Group to initialize a return of INA to its Syrian oil and gas fields.

Year	Exchange rate (to 1 USD)	Revenue (in mil. USD)	Revenue (in mil. HRK)	Operating income (in mil. USD)	Operating income (in mil. HRK)	Net income (in mil. USD)	Net income (in mil. HRK)	Total assets (in mil. USD)	Total assets (in mil. HRK)	Employees	Stocks held by MOL (in %)	Stocks held by the Croatian government (in %)	Stocks held by others (in %)
2005	5.95	3,741	22,260	193	1,146	149	885	3,411	20,295	15,989	25.00	51.80	23.20
2006	5.84	4,248	24,807	189	1,105	151	884	3,800	22,188	15,873	25.00	51.80	23.20
2007	5.37	5,062	27,162	211	1,133	162	871	4,643	24,916	15,855	25.00	44.85	30.15
2008	4.93	5,767	28,459	107	530	-295	-1,456	5,393	26,613	16,604	47.15	44.84	8.01
2009	5.28	4,572	24,143	-93	-489	-46	-245	5,694	30,067	16,274	47.26	44.84	7.90
2010	5.50	5,070	27,885	240	1,318	182	1,001	5,678	31,231	14,719	49.08	44.84	6.08
2011	5.34	5,795	30,967	445	2,376	384	2,052	5,769	30,825	14,217	49.08	44.84	6.08
2012	5.85	5,239	30,654	182	1,067	101	589	4,820	28,200	13,854	49.08	44.84	6.08
2013	5.71	4,997	28,514	-318	-1,816	-304	-1,736	4,541	25,909	13,460	49.08	44.84	6.08
2014	5.75	4,295	24,693	-406	-2,334	-211	-1,215	3,864	22,215	12,503	49.08	44.84	6.08
2015	6.86	2,909	19,964	-255	-1,749	-135	-929	2,970	20,382	11,256	49.08	44.84	6.08
2016	6.80	2,380	16,192	68	461	27	184	2,982	20,292	10,861	49.08	44.84	6.08
2017	6.62	2,950	19,535	236	1,564	163	1,081	2,909	19,263	10,782	49.08	44.84	6.08
2018	6.28	3,719	23,348	242	1,520	167	1,051	3,304	20,742	10,844	49.08	44.84	6.08
2019	6.62	3,535	23,411	100	659	97	641	3,251	21,532	10,577	49.08	44.84	6.08
2020	6.61	2,348	15,525	-192	-1,272	-187	-1,234	2,873	18,996	9,830	49.08	44.84	6.08
2021	6.36	3,672	23,366	249	1,587	224	1,425	3,456	21,990	9,751	49.08	44.84	6.08

The following table shows the main financial indicators of only INA d.d. for the period from 2005-2021, based on the yearly financial reports.

Year	Exchange rate (to 1 USD)	Revenue (in mil. USD)	Revenue (in mil. HRK)	Operating income (in mil. USD)	Operating income (in mil. HRK)	Net income (in mil. USD)	Net income (in mil. HRK)	Total assets (in mil. USD)	Total assets (in mil. HRK)	Employees
2005	5.95	3,233	19,234	187	1,115	150	892	3,149	18,737	10,290
2006	5.84	3,741	21,845	145	844	115	670	3,475	20,293	10,183
2007	5.37	4,360	23,394	224	1,200	184	990	4,283	22,984	10,123
2008	4.93	5,014	24,739	156	770	-244	-1,204	5,007	24,707	10,080
2009	5.28	3,737	19,735	-23	-119	-92	-486	5,315	28,064	9,901
2010	5.50	4,419	24,302	396	2,179	324	1,784	5,494	30,216	9,061
2011	5.34	5,092	27,211	480	2,565	417	2,227	5,576	29,795	8,876
2012	5.85	4,583	26,816	285	1,669	209	1,220	4,691	27,445	8,712
2013	5.71	4,344	24,786	-345	-1,967	-321	-1,830	4,412	25,172	8,517
2014	5.75	3,864	22,214	26	150	233	1,342	3,686	21,193	8,150
2015	6.86	2,590	17,775	-218	-1,498	-105	-723	2,888	19,816	7,352
2016	6.80	2,213	15,059	74	502	38	258	2,961	20,145	4,387
2017	6.62	2,776	18,385	268	1,774	191	1,266	2,901	19,214	4,292
2018	6.28	3,492	21,924	264	1,657	195	1,226	3,325	20,877	4,138
2019	6.62	3,264	21,613	121	802	120	792	3,335	22,086	3,677
2020	6.61	2,153	14,232	-158	-1,047	-154	-1,015	2,987	19,744	3,411
2021	6.36	3,512	22,348	239	1,522	219	1,391	3,572	22,731	3,222

== See also ==
- Hetem Ramadani
- List of companies of the Socialist Federal Republic of Yugoslavia
