= Tag-along right =

Clauses in corporate law

Tag-along rights (TARs) comprise a group of clauses in a contract which together have the effect of allowing the minority shareholder(s) in a corporation to also take part in a sale of shares by the majority shareholder to a third party under the same terms and conditions.

Consider an example: A and B are both shareholders in a company, with A being the majority shareholder and B the minority shareholder. C, a third party, offers to buy A's shares at an attractive price, and A accepts. In this situation, tag-along rights would allow B to also participate in the sale under the same terms and conditions as A.

As with other contractual provisions, tag-along rights originated from the doctrine of freedom of contract and is governed by contract law (in common law countries) or the law of obligations (in civil law countries). As tag-along rights are contractual terms between private parties, they are often found in venture capital and private equity firms but not public companies.

== Structure ==
Generally speaking, tag-along rights comprise three devices: the tag-along clause itself, and a method of enforcement, such as a put option and/or a penalty clause (only applicable in civil law countries as the common law does not uphold penalty clauses).

The tag-along clause itself grants the minority shareholder the right (but not the obligation) to participate in the sale planned by the majority. The majority shareholder must notify all other minority shareholders covered under tag-along provisions and allow them to join in the transaction. If the majority shareholder ignores this obligation, the put option/right to sell provisions engage to enforce the tag-along clause. For instance, if A sells his/her shares to C without including B, the put option would entitle B the right to sell his/her holding to A. A now has a legal obligation to buy B's shares if B so chooses to exercise his/her put option, which disincentivizes A's original opportunistic behaviour. In essence, the gist of this mechanism is quite simply "Either you let me out or you stay in". The possible inclusion of a penalty clause as a premium on top of the put option further disincentivizes opportunistic behaviour because A will now have to buy B's shares in the company at a higher price than when he/she originally sold his/her stake to C, effectively meaning "Either you let me out or you stay in, with a penalty".

== Purpose ==
The main purpose of tag-along rights is to protect minority shareholder interests in any transaction. Majority shareholders are usually big firms with many connections, better negotiating power and stronger capital, and as such are more likely to be able to find a buyer for their shares. Hence, tag-along rights allow the minority shareholder to increase the liquidity of their shares because he or she will be afforded the opportunity to participate in any deal struck by the majority and prevent them from being "left-behind" in a deal. Another reason is that when a majority owner sells his or her stake in a business, this dominant position allows the seller to sell at a price higher than the intrinsic price of the share itself, called a control premium, because the majority holder possesses a higher degree of freedom to make their decisions for the company. Tag-along rights allow minority holders to also join in this premium and be able to sell their shares at this higher price in any sale between a majority and a third party. Because tag-along rights are rights and not obligations, minority shareholders may or may not choose to exercise them. This allows minority shareholders to have a choice in the event of a majority of the equity changing hands. They can elect to either remain an owner of the company or invoke the tag-along rights and participate in the sale.

A downside of tag-along rights is that, because they protect minority interests, the majority shareholder takes on the more onerous task of taking into account the shares of the minority in negotiating a sale, which "may diminish the marketability of the shares". There is also uncertainty regarding which minority shareholders will participate in the sale, which could also have an impact on the final purchase price. The fact that tag-along rights require tagging shareholders to sell shares "under the same terms and conditions" as the majority shareholders can also be a double-edged sword. This is because in some cases these minority shareholders might want to avoid certain obligations, such as exposure to indemnity claims relating to the company, that the majority shareholder is beholden to.

== Enforceability ==
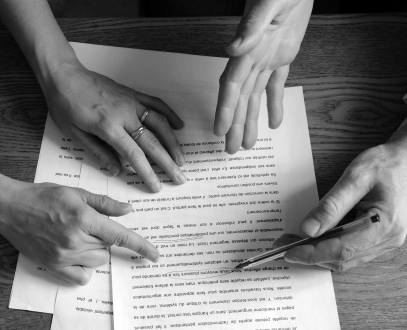
Tag-along rights are usually incorporated into a shareholder's agreement, a type of contract.

Tag-along rights are a form of contract clause and therefore not enshrined in statutes. As such, they have to be agreed upon by the parties beforehand in a shareholders' agreement. Unlike a company's articles of association, these shareholders’ agreements are not public documents registered to the government, but private dealings between parties. As such, they are not binding on all members of the company, only the participants to the shareholder agreement. This doctrine was made clear in Welton v Saffery [1897] AC 299, where Davey LJ held:

"such contracts [...] would create personal obligations, or an exceptio personalis against themselves only, and would not become a regulation of the company, or be binding on the transferees of the parties to it, or upon new or non-assenting shareholders"

In this sense, despite the nomenclature, tag-along rights are found to be enforceable in and operate in the same way as any other contractual term, but not as a right in the ordinary sense of the word (e.g., right to free speech). Building on the holding from Welton, the House of Lords further held in the landmark case of Russell v Northern Bank Development Corp Ltd [1992] 1 WLR 588 that any agreement that restrains a company's statutory rights, even when the company itself voluntarily entered into such an agreement, would be held unenforceable.

As with other contractual terms, the exact wording of the tag-along right would also be examined by courts to determine its enforceability. In Seidensticker v. Gasparilla Inn, Inc., No. 2555-CC, 2007 WL 1930428, the Delaware Court of Chancery held that tag-along rights are not enforceable if the language of the clause itself does not support such an understanding, regardless of the parties' intentions in drafting the clause.

== Usage ==
Numerous factors shape the use of tag-along rights.

=== Types of tag-along rights ===
There are two main types of tag-along provisions. The first ("full" tag-along right) allows the minority shareholder to sell all of their shares in the event of a transaction between the majority shareholder and a third party. The second ("pro-rata" tag-along right) forces the majority holder to reduce the amount of equity it wants to sell and provide the minority an opportunity to also sell their shares on a proportional (pro-rata) basis. Full tag-along rights are usually found in firms where there are few investors and each investor has strong rights, as "contractual rights of investors balance each other and a controlling member, if any, has limited maneuvering room for extracting private benefits", while the pro-rata option is "the appropriate measure" for firms with many investors who possess weak minority rights.

=== Notice periods ===
The period of notice for the exercise of tag-along provisions is also important. Too short a notice period will make it difficult for other shareholders to make an informed decision about whether to participate in the sale, while a period too long will dissuade potential buyers who do not want to comply with such a cumbersome process. Failure to comply with the period of notice might also render the clause to be unenforceable in court, as ruled in Halpin v. Riverstone National, Inc., C.A. No. 9796-VCG (the Court in this case dealt with drag-along rights, another similar provision, but the overall principle still holds mutatis mutandis). Since participating shareholders are unable to sell their shares to another potential buyer when an existing sale agreement is still pending, it is necessary to impose a maximum time limit for the completion of a sale.

=== Substitution of consideration ===
It might be worth considering situations where it is appropriate for different shareholders to receive alternative forms of consideration of equal value other than cash in a tag-along sale, subject to the negotiations of all parties concerned. This is important as the original definition of tag-along rights require all participating parties to be subjected under the same terms and conditions, which will have required that the form of consideration to be received by selling shareholders to be uniform across all those parties. For instance, in a standard tag-along sale, the majority and minority shareholders will all be compensated with the same amount of cash per share. However, subject to negotiations between the parties, the third-party purchaser may decide to pay certain shareholders using non-cash forms of consideration (e.g. securities) while paying others with cash, which would be a violation of the "subjected under the same terms and conditions" provision under standard tag-along rights. Hence, alternative forms of non-cash consideration should be considered and addressed in the shareholders' agreement beforehand in order to avoid any disputes.

=== Multiple classes of shares ===
Some companies have a structure which incorporates multiple classes of shares (e.g. A, B and C) that entail different rights/obligations regarding dividends, voting power, asset sales, etc... Hence, the value of a share is affected by its share class, sometimes to a great degree (e.g. as of 22 April 2026, a Berkshire Hathaway Class-A share [NYSE: BRK-A] is worth $702,980, whereas a Class-B share from the same company [NYSE: BRK-B] is only worth $465.40).As such, in these cases, the provisions that shareholders sell at the "same price" and on the "same terms and conditions" must be carefully considered, taking into account the different share classes and their respective values subject to the rights and obligations afforded by each share class. Once the transaction is completed, further considerations is warranted towards whether the new owners may convert their newly purchased shares into a single class. This will not only depend upon the wishes of the new shareholders him/herself, but also upon the impact of what such a conversion (or lack thereof) will have on the equilibrium of control amongst the remaining shareholders (who may not be willing to consent to such a decision).

=== Permitted Transfers ===
There will occasionally be situations where the transfer of shares should not trigger tag-along provisions, such as when the transfer is not a true sale of shares (e.g. transferring to heirs/other family members). These special "permitted transfers" would need to be specifically considered in the shareholders' agreement and be excluded from the operation of tag-along provisions. However, care must be taken to prevent these "permitted transfers" to be used as a circumvention of minority protections, whereby shares are transferred to a newly formed affiliate which is not bound by agreements between current shareholders, allowing this shareholder to subsequently sell these shares with impunity. A method of avoiding this complication is by requiring that any such affiliate to be subjected to the original tag-along rights. Failure to comply with this arrangement will result in the affiliate losing its "permitted transferee" status and having to transfer its newly acquired shares back to the original shareholder.

=== Compliance with municipal law ===
Care must be taken to ensure that tag-along provisions do not violate municipal law, which varies between jurisdictions. A common obstacle in exercising tag-along rights found in countries like Korea and Japan, where Articles 355 and 204 of their respective Commercial Codes mandate that any transaction of equity has to be approved by the board within 30 days, beyond which point consent is assumed. Another example is found in Brazil, where Article 254-A of Law No.6404 (inserted by Law No. 10303) mandates that the party purchasing a majority stake in a company must not offer the minority holder less than 20% of the price of the offer to the majority holder. In India, the Supreme Court held in the decision of VB Rangaraj v. VB Gopalakrishnan that any restrictions on transferability of shares, even those arising from agreements freely entered into by shareholders on an inter se basis, would be considered unenforceable if it violates the company's article of association.

== See also ==
- Drag-along right, the opposite concept
- Pre-emption right
- Right of first refusal
