= Drag-along right =

Concept in corporate law

Drag-along right (DAR) is a concept in corporate law, often encountered in the context of venture capital and private equity.

Under the concept, if the majority shareholder(s) of an entity sells their stake, the prospective owner(s) have the right to force the remaining minority shareholders to join the deal. However, the owner must usually offer the same terms and conditions to the minority shareholders as to the majority shareholder(s). Drag-along rights are fairly standard terms in a stock purchase agreement.

This right protects majority shareholders (allowing them to sell to an owner desiring total control of the entity, without being encumbered by holdout investors), but also protects minority shareholders (who can sell their investment on the same terms and conditions as the majority shareholder). This differs from a tag-along right, which also allows minority shareholders to sell on the same terms and conditions (and requires the new owner to offer them), but does not require them to sell.

In most jurisdictions drag-along and tag-along rights are not statutory rights and will need to be included in the shareholders agreement or articles of association of the company. The provisions will typically specify the percentage of shareholders required for triggering the drag-along right.

Drag-along rights typically terminate upon an initial public offering.

== See also ==
- Pre-emption right
- Right of first refusal
- Tag-along right, the converse concept
